= Datchinamurthy Kataiah =

Malaysian drug trafficker (1985–2025)

- Born: 30 December 1985; Malaysia
- Died: 25 September 2025 (aged 39); Changi Prison, Singapore
- Occupation: Factory worker
- Status: Executed by hanging
- Criminal charge: Drug trafficking
- Penalty: Death

Datchinamurthy a/l Kataiah (30 December 1985 – 25 September 2025) was a Malaysian man who was sentenced to death and hanged in Singapore for drug trafficking. Datchinamurthy was convicted of trafficking nearly 45 g of heroin across the Woodlands Checkpoint from Malaysia to Singapore in January 2011. Having been convicted of the crime and also not certified as a courier, Datchinamurthy was sentenced to death in 2015. His co-accused, Christeen d/o Jayamany, was sentenced to life imprisonment for the same offence.

After Datchinamurthy lost his appeal in January 2016, he tried to appeal to the President of Singapore for clemency to commute his sentence to life imprisonment. The clemency process took three years before it concluded with a denial of clemency. Originally scheduled for 29 April 2022, Datchinamurty's execution was suspended due to further appeals he pursued in relation to his case, and three years later, Datchinamurthy was executed by hanging in Changi Prison on 25 September 2025, after he failed to obtain clemency for the final time.

== Background ==
Born on 30 December 1985 in an unspecified state in Malaysia, Datchinamurthy was the only son of his parents. He grew up together with his three sisters at Johor Bahru. His family was poor during his early life and Datchinamurthy was close to his family.

It was revealed in 2022 that Datchinamurthy's father died a year after his son was arrested for drug offences, and he never got to see his son one last time at his deathbed; Datchinamurthy was also denied leave to go attend the funeral, where the son must be present at a parent's burial according to Hindu traditions.

== Crime and sentence ==
=== Capture and trial ===
On 18 January 2011, Datchinamurthy, together with his 33-year-old Singaporean accomplice Christeen Jayamany, were arrested at the Woodlands Checkpoint by the Singapore authorities for allegedly trafficking over 44.96g of heroin across the border of Singapore from Malaysia. As the amount of trafficked heroin exceeded 15g, Datchinamurthy and Christeen were both charged with capital drug trafficking, which warrants the mandatory death penalty in Singapore if found guilty. They were later both tried in the High Court of Singapore for the alleged offences.

According to both the defendants' accounts, prior to their capture, Christeen, who was facing financial difficulties and needed money to take care of her children, was hired by Datchinamurthy through connections and introductions to other people. She was asked to deliver something by Datchinamurthy, who provided her a bag which she should pass to another person, and Datchinamurthy stated he would pay her $200 once the job was done. Christeen also stated she did not know that the bag contained packages of drugs. Likewise, Datchinamurthy denied that he had any knowledge of the drugs. He stated he had been offered a job by a friend named "Rajah", who wanted to pay him to deliver some drugs, which Rajah assured him were "not serious" and Datchinamurthy thus believed he was delivering traditional Chinese medicine after checking the bags himself and thus did not suspect anything; the drugs, according to him, looked brown and did not look white (which was the normal appearance of heroin). Datchinamurthy was also in charge of relaying messages between Rajah and Christeen. Hence, both accused persons sought to downplay their conduct and paint themselves as couriers, through their defence lawyers, to escape the death penalty. Under the law, suspects acting as couriers or suffering from diminished responsibility, may be eligible for life imprisonment.

On 8 May 2015, the trial judge Tay Yong Kwang convicted both Christeen and Datchinamurthy, as he found that both of them were aware of the existence of heroin and hence failed to rebut the presumption of knowledge. Justice Tay found that in Datchinamurthy's case, he was not acting as a simple drug runner, as he was promised payment of hundreds of dollars (in both SGD and Malaysian Ringgit) by his alleged boss Rajah. He had also taken the role of hiring Christeen in helping him to deliver the drugs. It was impossible for him to have huge trust in Rajah, with whom he had a short encounter, and he also demonstrated his huge suspicion that he was carrying illegal drugs, which should have been reflected from the way of operations and delivery. Hence, Datchinamurthy failed to prove himself as a courier and hence, he was sentenced to death by hanging. Christeen, who was certified as a courier and had given substantive assistance to the authorities in tackling drug offences, was spared the gallows and she was therefore sentenced to life imprisonment, with effect from the date of her arrest. Christeen also did not receive caning since she was a female.

As of 2025, Christeen remains incarcerated at Changi Women's Prison (later renamed as Institution A4). According to a 2025 CNA-produced documentary Inside The Women’s Prison, which featured the prison life of female inmates in Singapore, Christeen's first parole hearing will take place in 2031, and in an interview by the producers, Christeen expressed remorse and stated that she paid a "heavy price" for her crime.

=== Appeal and clemency plea ===
Datchinamurthy, who was held on death row at Changi Prison after the end of his trial, later filed an appeal against his sentence. However, the Court of Appeal of Singapore dismissed his appeal on 5 February 2016, as the three judges - Chao Hick Tin, Andrew Phang, and Kan Ting Chiu - determined that Datchinamurthy had failed to rebut the legal presumption of him carrying the illegal drugs and the totality of evidence had suggested no error in convicting Datchinamurthy of his original drug trafficking charge.

Datchinamurthy subsequently submitted an appeal for clemency to the President of Singapore, hoping that his death sentence could be commuted to life imprisonment. Had he succeeded in receiving the pardon, Datchinamurthy would have become the first person to escape the gallows after the 1998 clemency pardon of 19-year-old Mathavakannan Kalimuthu, who was found guilty of murdering a gangster in 1996. Mathavakannan was paroled and released in 2012 after serving 16 years out of his life sentence due to good behaviour. Datchinamurthy's family gathered to plead for clemency from the Singapore government, stating that there was no fair trial for Datchinamurthy, and he was allegedly being subjected to different treatment from Christeen, who was sentenced to life imprisonment instead of death.

In July 2019, on the advice of the Cabinet, Datchinamurthy's clemency appeal was dismissed by President Halimah Yacob. Three other Malaysian convicts on death row - Gobi Avedian, Abdul Helmi Ab Halim and Rahmat Karimon - also lost their clemency pleas at around the same time Datchinamurthy failed to receive his pardon, along with nine other prisoners. There were international fears that this phenomenon might signal a rise in executions of drug traffickers in Singapore, and some Malaysian lawyers also claimed that Singapore had intentionally targeted Malaysian death row convicts, which the Singapore government denied.

== Subsequent legal developments ==
While he was still awaiting the outcome of his petition for clemency, together with fellow Malaysian drug convict Prabagaran Srivijayan (16 November 1987 – 14 July 2017), Datchinamurthy and his mother, through his Malaysian lawyer, filed a petition to the High Court of Malaysia, asking for the matter to be taken to the International Court of Justice to prosecute Singapore for the conviction of Malaysian citizens for drug trafficking. However, in March 2017, this lawsuit was not accepted as the Malaysian court has no jurisdiction in a matter related to foreign policy.

After the loss of his clemency petition, on the orders of the President of Singapore, a death warrant was issued for Datchinamurthy, who was scheduled to hang on 12 February 2020 at Changi Prison for his crime. However, the execution date was postponed due to a last-minute appeal filed by Datchinamurthy to delay his execution. Datchinamurthy, together with another Malaysian Gobi Avedian, alleged that the executions at Changi Prison were carried out by kicking the back of the prisoner's neck in the event of the rope breaking, which meant that the convicts would be suffering from unlawful execution and thus being unfairly treated by law. This legal application was dismissed by the High Court on 13 February 2020. Datchinamurthy's lawyer M Ravi also alleged that he was threatened by the prosecution in relation to this matter, which was also rejected by the High Court. The Attorney-General's Chambers (AGC) also issued correction orders under POFMA towards Malaysian human rights group Lawyers for Liberty for starting the above allegations of illegal execution methods, calling these claims "baseless" and "untrue". The Court of Appeal also affirmed the High Court's decision to dismiss the lawsuit in August 2020.

Datchinamurthy was also involved in another lawsuit, which was about the claims of the private letters between the death row inmates and both their lawyers and families were being forwarded from prisons to the AGC, and it led to these said inmates pursuing legal proceedings against the AGC or its members for alleged breaches of conduct to protect the inmates' rights, misconduct in public office and seeking damages for any harm caused by such. Datchinamurthy, together with 21 other death row inmates (most of whom sentenced for drug trafficking), were represented by human rights lawyer M Ravi to seek the identities of whoever ordered or carried out the sending of the inmates' information to the AGC. The lawsuit was dismissed on 16 March 2021. The inmates, including Datchinamurthy, were ordered to pay $10 in costs for the lawsuit. Still, Datchinamurthy and 12 other prisoners out of the 22 original plaintiffs filed civil suits against the Attorney-General of Singapore for this issue, and this lawsuit was later withdrawn in November 2021 by the lawyer Ravi himself, who also had to bear the costs of over $10,000 for this lawsuit.

Separate from Datchinamurthy's case, another death row convict tried to make use of Datchinamurthy's case to argue he was discriminated by nationality regarding the scheduling of executions. Syed Suhail Syed Zin, a Singaporean drug offender who was sentenced to death on 2 December 2015, tried to argue that he was sentenced to death on a date which took place later than Datchinamurthy, yet his own execution was conducted earlier than Datchinamurthy's unscheduled hanging, and due to the travel restrictions of foreigners' entry into Singapore to visit their relatives in prison due to the COVID-19 pandemic in Singapore, he was discriminated as a Singaporean through the scheduling of executions. However, this was not accepted by the courts, as they stated that Datchinamurthy, compared to Suhail who had exhausted all his avenues of appeal, had a different situation given he still had recourse to review his case and appeal, and it was baseless to allege any discriminatory practices against inmates based on nationality in scheduling their executions. Hence, Suhail lost this legal attempt to delay his execution.

Datchinamurthy later filed a legal application to the courts to review his case. The review ended with the Court of Appeal upholding the death sentence passed upon Datchinamurthy on 5 April 2021.

== First execution notice and opposition ==
=== Scheduling of execution and criticisms ===
On 22 April 2022, Datchinamurthy's execution was scheduled to take place a week later on 29 April 2022. M. Ravi, who represented Datchinamurthy, called this a "contempt of court" as Datchinamurthy's execution was scheduled to take place a month before his next legal application against the Attorney General can be heard, since the date of hearing was on 20 May 2022. The scheduling of Datchinamurthy's execution attracted criticisms from human rights activists and Malaysian rights lawyer N. Surendran, especially since at the same time, another Malaysian drug trafficker Nagaenthran K. Dharmalingam was pending to be executed on 27 April 2022 despite the allegations that he was intellectually disabled (a fact proven wrong by the psychiatrists and courts of Singapore). There were also pleas for mercy on both Nagaenthran and Datchinamurthy for their lives to be spared.

On 25 April 2022, the United Nations Human Rights Office issued an official statement, in which they opposed the executions of both Nagaenthran and Datchinamurthy due to their fears that the Singapore government may conduct more executions in the near future, with the increasing phenomenon of death warrants issued for drug convicts on death row. Furthermore, they urged Singapore to reconsider their drug laws and use of the death penalty in the city state. On the same day of the UN's statement, a candlelight vigil was held on behalf of Datchinamurthy and Nagaenthran to show opposition to their upcoming executions. According to Datchinamurthy's sister Sathirani, she said she was very shocked at the prospect that her brother would be executed despite his role as a courier and her brother felt that his punishment was unfair for him. She and the rest of her family members were present at the vigil held for Datchinamurthy but unable to attend since foreigners were prohibited from taking part in any protests in Singapore.

== Stay of execution ==
=== Appeal and verdict ===
On 28 April 2022, a day before his execution, Datchinamurthy filed a last-minute appeal to seek a stay of execution, stating that he should not be executed when he had a pending legal application (related to prison correspondence misconduct) that had not concluded. He represented himself due to his family unable to engage any legal counsel to represent him. As the timing of this last-minute appeal coincided with the time when Datchinamurthy's best friend Nagaenthran was executed and its resulting aftermath, there were calls from activists and the European Union (EU) for Datchinamurthy's sentence to be commuted, and also, due to the Attorney-General's Chambers issuing a warning against inappropriate moves of making last-minute appeals without new evidence as a result of the abuse of court processes by Nagaenthran, there were no lawyers willing to take Datchinamurthy's case, hence it led to Datchinamurthy having to make his own arguments in court.

Datchinamurthy was later granted a stay of execution, meaning that he would not be executed as scheduled, until the conclusion of his pending lawsuit. The prosecution's appeal to overturn the stay order was rejected on the same day by the Court of Appeal. In their full grounds of decision released on 30 May 2022, the three-judge panel found that Datchinamurthy's upcoming legal application was relevant and it required his involvement since he had a case of alleged unequal treatment and the need for him to be present to give his evidence and testimony in order for the judge to decide if his case is baseless or not. The Court of Appeal also reiterated that this did not mean that a prisoner awaiting capital punishment would automatically be granted a stay of execution on the basis of unequal treatment, since the facts were needed to show if there is a relevant pending legal application in the prisoner's suit, which they mentioned was a contrast to the countless unmeritorious appeals made by executed drug trafficker Nagaenthran K. Dharmalingam. The three-judge appellate panel commented that Datchinamurthy appeared to be "singled out" when it comes to the scheduling of his execution in contrast to the twelve other plaintiffs of his civil lawsuit.

== Further appeals ==
=== Civil claim and judicial review ===
The civil lawsuit that Datchinamurthy filed prior to his death warrant and stay of execution was scheduled to be heard on 9 June 2022. Datchinamurthy and the 12 other condemned inmates argued that there was a case of prison correspondence misconduct, which involved the prison authorities sharing the letters of the plaintiffs with the AGC, and the inmates sought damages for unlawful practice, breach of confidence and copyright infringement.

On 11 October 2024, the Court of Appeal's three judges – Chief Justice Sundaresh Menon, Senior Judge Judith Prakash and Justice Steven Chong – ruled that the AGC and SPS unlawfully breached the confidentiality of letters from 13 death-row inmates. The judges emphasized the importance of prisoners' rights to maintain confidential correspondence, particularly with legal counsel. Although SPS and AGC justified their actions by stating they needed legal advice, the court found no need to share these letters. The court also upheld nominal damages for copyright breach but denied any compensation for breach of confidence.

=== Lawsuit against Attorney-General ===
On 3 August 2022, Datchinamurthy was also one of the 24 prisoners (which included murderer Iskandar Rahmat and drug traffickers Pannir Selvam Pranthaman and Abdul Rahim Shapiee) to sue the Attorney-General for the obstruction of the inmates' access to defence counsel, which led to Datchinamurthy and many others having to argue their appeals unrepresented, which allegedly created unfairness to the inmates in legal proceedings. However, the lawsuit was rejected by the High Court as the lawyers have legitimate reasons to turn down the death row cases and there was no evidence that the strict court orders and monetary penalties issued to the lawyers who made unmeritorious appeals had led to many lawyers developing fear over defending the death row inmates. Specifically in Datchinamurthy's case, High Court judge See Kee Oon judged that the 36-year-old Malaysian did not appear to have been prejudiced by the fact that he was unrepresented, as his application for a stay of execution was successful and he was represented in his civil claim at court. The follow-up appeal related to this lawsuit was likewise rejected by the Court of Appeal on 4 August 2022. In the aftermath, one of the prisoners Abdul Rahim Shapiee was executed on 5 August 2022, the day after the loss of the lawsuit.

=== Constitutionality challenge ===
Datchinamurthy, together with Singaporean Jumaat Mohamed Sayed and two Malaysians Saminathan Selvaraju and Lingkesvaran Rajendaren (all three of them also sentenced to death for drug trafficking), filed a joint constitutional challenge against certain provisions of the Misuse of Drugs Act where the two provisions allegedly violate the constitutionally protected presumption of innocence and Articles 9 and 12 of the Constitution, meaning their rights to equal treatment under the law and no deprivation of their lives or personal liberties by non-legal means in their cases. However, the judge found that the two provisions do not deviate from the prosecution's responsibility to prove its case beyond reasonable doubt, and do not, by any means, violate the Constitution. As such, the appeal of Datchinamurthy and three other prisoners were dismissed by the High Court on 25 November 2022.

While pending their appeal in relation to this lawsuit, British lawyer Edward Fitzgerald, who was formerly the Queen's Counsel in January 1995, applied for permission to represent Datchinamurthy and Lingkesvaran in their lawsuit, while another lawyer from Australia, Theodoros Kassimatis (also a former Queen's Counsel in March 2017), also applied to represent the remaining two plaintiffs Saminathan and Jumaat. Although both the lawyers sought to be admitted to the Singapore Bar on an ad hoc basis in order to legally represent Datchinamurthy and the other three men, both Kassimatis and Fitzgerald failed to obtain permission from the High Court, as they did not meet the requirements under Singapore law to be able to gain admission to the Singapore Bar and represent Datchinamurthy and the other three traffickers. The appeal of the two foreign counsel was subsequently rejected by the Court of Appeal on 8 November 2024.

In August 2025, the Court of Appeal rejected the constitutional challenge.

=== Legal challenge against Pacc Act ===
In December 2023, Datchinamurthy was one of the 36 death row inmates who filed a legal motion to challenge the newly-enacted Post-Appeal Applications in Capital Cases Act (Pacc Act), which was designed to manage the last-minute appeals made by death row prisoners who exhausted all avenues of appeal. Datchinamurthy and his fellow plaintiffs argued that the new law was discriminatory against death row inmates and it would cut off the last chances of death row inmates' access to justice, which may lead to an unfair legal process. However, Justice Hoo Sheau Peng of the High Court dismissed the lawsuit, citing that the law was passed due to the increasing numbers of inmates filing last-minute appeals before their executions and abuse of court processes, and its purpose was to sieve out any appeals that were made without merit. Justice Hoo also said that the legal rights of the death row prisoners were not violated by the provisions of the Act, since the law was not passed for enforcement yet. A follow-up appeal by the same 36 plaintiffs was dismissed by the Court of Appeal on 27 March 2024.

== Execution ==
On 22 September 2025, it was reported that Datchinamurthy's new execution date was scheduled for 25 September. However, hours before the execution was to proceed, Datchinamurthy sentence was paused due to pending clemency petition submitted by activists a few days before. At 2pm, Datchinamurthy was hanged in Changi Prison, after the clemency petition was dismissed. Datchinamurthy was 39 years old.

Datchinamurthy was the 11th person and third Malaysian national to be executed in Singapore in 2025. The Central Narcotics Bureau confirmed the execution in an official statement, stating he received full due process and emphasizing that the amount of drugs he trafficked could have sustained the addiction of about 540 people for a week. The agency reiterated that capital punishment is reserved for the most serious crimes. However, the execution drew strong criticism from death penalty opponents. Malaysian human rights lawyer N. Surendran described it as an act of cruelty, criticizing the short stay of execution as a source of false hope for Datchinamurthy and his family.

According to Sin Chew Jit Poh, a Malaysian Chinese newspaper, Datchinamurthy's body was buried in a local cemetery in Ulu Tiram, Johor Bahru, after his remains were repatriated from Singapore to Malaysia.

== See also ==
- Capital punishment in Singapore
- Pannir Selvam Pranthaman
- Nagaenthran K. Dharmalingam
- Abdul Kahar Othman
- Gobi Avedian
