= Gobi Avedian =

Malaysian and former death row prisoner jailed for drug offences in Singapore

- Born: 7 April 1988 (age 38); Johor, Malaysia
- Occupation: Security guard (former)
- Status: Paroled and released from Changi Prison on 17 December 2024
- Criminal charges: Capital drug trafficking of heroin (acquitted); Attempted importation of a Class C drug (convicted)
- Penalty: Death penalty, later commuted to 15 years' imprisonment and ten strokes of the cane

Gobi a/l Avedian (born 7 April 1988) is a Malaysian drug convict who served a 15-year term of imprisonment in Singapore for attempted importation of a Class C drug. Gobi was at first, charged in 2014 with the capital charge of trafficking over 40.22g of heroin, which attracts the death penalty in Singapore. In his defence, Gobi stated that he was unaware he was carrying heroin and thought he was carrying "chocolate drugs" as what his two friends told him when he received an offer to deliver the drugs for money to pay his daughter's surgery fees.

At the end of the trial, the High Court acquitted Gobi of the original charge after accepting his defence and account. As such, the High Court sentenced him to 15 years' imprisonment and ten strokes of the cane for a lower charge in May 2017. Upon the prosecution's appeal however, Gobi was convicted of the original capital charge and sentenced to death by the Court of Appeal in October 2018, as the appellate court found that the lower court has erred in finding Gobi not guilty.

Subsequently, Gobi filed for clemency, which was rejected in July 2019. He later made two different appeals: the first to delay his execution and the second to re-open his case. Although Gobi lost his bid for a stay of execution in February 2020, he was eventually successful in persuading the Court of Appeal in October 2020 to re-open his case in light of a 2019 landmark case ruling, and he subsequently has his death sentence commuted to his original sentence of 15 years' imprisonment and ten strokes of the cane, thus enabling him to escape the death penalty a second time. He is presently released since 2024.

== Personal life and crime ==
=== Daughter's health issues and motive ===
Born on 7 April 1988 in Malaysia, Gobi Avedian, who lived in Johor Bahru, was a security guard working in Singapore on a work permit, and was also married with two children.

In late 2014, Gobi's daughter suffered from a health issue and required an operation, which would take place in January 2015. As he was burdened with the expensive hospital bills since his salary as a security guard was very low and could not afford the medical fees, he was asked by two friends "Vinod" and "Guru" to transport drugs to Singapore. According to Gobi after his arrest and on his trial, he was paid RM500 to transport each bag of "chocolate drugs" from Malaysia to Singapore. At first, he declined to do so, but it was due to his daughter's date of operation drawing near, he agreed to help transport the drugs. Gobi claimed that he asked Vinod if the drugs were dangerous, and he was assured by Vinod that these drugs were merely disco drugs mixed with chocolate, and are not dangerous, and Vinod added that the punishment, if caught with these drugs, would be a small fine or light punishment. After accepting the job, Gobi delivered the drugs for eight to nine times from Malaysia to Singapore.

=== Arrest and trial ===
On 11 December 2014, 26-year-old Gobi carried out his ninth or tenth attempt to deliver the drugs while on his way to work in Singapore. However, after crossing the border into Singapore, he was arrested at the Woodlands Checkpoint when he was approached and searched by the officers, who discovered the drugs. Upon further testing of the packages however, it turned out that the disco drugs and chocolate drugs were actually heroin, and the heroin found weighed a total of 40.22g. In view of the discovery, Gobi was charged with capital drug trafficking, a crime which attracts the death penalty in Singapore if found guilty, unless Gobi could prove that he either acted as a mere courier or suffering from a mental illness (which might warrant life imprisonment instead if fulfilled).

Gobi would stand trial in the High Court three years later in 2017, with defence lawyer Shashi Nathan (who formerly represented convicted murderer Iskandar Rahmat) defending him in his trial. During Gobi's trial, Gobi gave his account of what happened prior to his capture and he argued that he did not know that these "chocolate drugs" contained 40.22g of heroin. However, the prosecution argued that Gobi was wilfully blind to the drugs' existence, and has failed to rebut the statutory presumption of knowledge of the nature of the drugs he was carrying.

At the end of the trial on 15 May 2017, the High Court's judge Lee Seiu Kin accepted that he did not know the bundles he was carrying contained heroin, and ruled that he should not be held liable for the capital charge, which required the conditions of the "presumption of knowledge of drugs" and "wilfull blindness" to prove a drug trafficker guilty. As such, Justice Lee convicted Gobi of a lesser charge of attempted trafficking of a Class C drug (which refers to drugs that did not attract the death penalty), and sentenced him to 15 years' imprisonment and ten strokes of the cane, and backdate Gobi's sentence to the date of his arrest.

== Prosecution's appeal ==
However, a year later, the prosecution appealed against Gobi's acquittal, arguing that Gobi did not take enough steps to satisfy himself that the drugs he transported were not those that would attract the death penalty, such as probing the people who gave him assurances. On 25 October 2018, the Court of Appeal decided to overturn the High Court's decision. Instead, they convicted Gobi of the original charge and dismissed his caning and 15-year sentence.

In its judgement, the Court of Appeal agreed with the prosecution that Gobi had failed to rebut the statutory presumption of knowledge of the nature of the drugs he was carrying, and stated Gobi should have done more to find out what exactly was the substance he was told to bring in to Singapore, but he simply "did not bother". The court also commented that while Gobi did ask about the possible penalties for the crime he was committing, the court said this would not have helped him identify the drug. It was insufficient to just state that he did not know what sort of drugs he was transporting. And, if Gobi really did not want to bring in any illegal drugs that could warrant a death sentence, he should have go and research what are the drugs that might attract such a harsh punishment and identify them but he did not do so. Due to this, he was deemed guilty of the original capital charge of trafficking heroin.

Since Gobi was not certified to have assisted the Central Narcotics Bureau (CNB) in a substantive way, and did not suffer from diminished responsibility, he was ineligible for the alternative penalty of life imprisonment. Hence, Gobi was sentenced to death by hanging.

== Gobi's appeals and second acquittal ==
=== Failure of clemency plea and unsuccessful stay of execution ===
Subsequently, after he was sentenced to death, Gobi filed for clemency, which would allow his sentence be commuted to life imprisonment if successful.

On 10 July 2019, Gobi's clemency petition was rejected by President Halimah Yacob. There were twelve more prisoners, including three other Malaysian drug convicts on death row - Datchinamurthy Kataiah, Abdul Helmi Ab Halim and Rahmat Karimon - who also lost their clemency pleas at around the same time Gobi failed to obtain clemency. There were international fears that these mass clemency rejections would result in an increasing trend of executions of drug traffickers in Singapore, and some Malaysian lawyers also claimed that Singapore had intentionally targeted Malaysian convicts for executions, which the Singapore government refuted in return.

Later, in January 2020, both Gobi and Datchinamurthy filed for a legal application to delay their executions, because they alleged that the executions at Changi Prison were carried out by kicking the back of the prisoner's neck in the event of the rope breaking, which meant that the convicts would be suffering from unlawful execution and thus being unfairly treated by law. This legal application was later rejected by the High Court on 13 February 2020. The High Court also dismissed Gobi's lawyer M Ravi's allegation that the prosecution threatened him regarding this matter. The Attorney-General's Chambers (AGC) subsequently filed for correction orders under POFMA towards Malaysian human rights group Lawyers for Liberty for spreading the above misinformation of illegal execution methods, and they described these allegations as "baseless" and "untrue". The Court of Appeal likewise dismissed the two men's appeal to delay their executions in August 2020.

=== Re-trial and commutation of death penalty ===
After this, Gobi, through his lawyer M Ravi, filed for an application to re-open his case in light of a recent appeal ruling by the Court of Appeal over an unrelated 2019 drug trafficking case of Nigerian citizen Adili Chibuike Ejike (who was formerly sentenced to death in 2017). In this ruling, the Court of Appeal held that the legal concept of wilful blindness is irrelevant in considering whether the presumption of possession under Section 18(2) of the MDA has been rebutted, which resulted in Adili's acquittal. Making use of this above appeal ruling, Ravi argued on behalf of his client that since the prosecution's case in the original trial was one of wilful blindness, the prosecution could not have invoked the presumption in the first place.

On 19 October 2020, in accordance to the framework laid out by Kho Jabing's case based on the reopening of concluded criminal cases, the Court of Appeal approved Gobi's application and review the case on the same day of the application's approval. After reviewing the case, the five judges hearing the appeal - Chief Justice Sundaresh Menon and four Judges of Appeal Judith Prakash, Tay Yong Kwang, Andrew Phang and Steven Chong - decided that Gobi's failure to rebut the presumption of knowledge could no longer become the foundation of his conviction on the capital charge. CJ Menon, who delivered the judgement, stated that the five judges determined that in contrast to the prosecution's arguments, Gobi was not wilfully blind to the nature of the drugs, and noted that Gobi did question the nature of the drugs but felt assured that they are not serious. As such, they revoked Gobi's death sentence, and reinstated his initial conviction by the High Court, and restored Gobi's original sentence of 15 years' imprisonment and ten strokes of the cane, and backdate it to the date of his remand. This commutation of his death sentence allowed 32-year-old Gobi Avedian to escape the gallows a second time.

Gobi Avedian was the second drug convict on death row to be acquitted by the Court of Appeal in October 2020, after 38-year-old Penang-born Beh Chew Boo who was acquitted just six days prior to Gobi's acquittal. Beh was at first sentenced to death for importing methamphetamine by the High Court in January 2020 before the Court of Appeal acquitted him and he returned to Malaysia since his release in March 2021.

Gobi's case was also the first capital case in Singapore's legal history where a death sentence was revoked on a review by the Court of Appeal after exhausting all the usual avenue of appeals.

Gobi's sentence was backdated to the date of his remand in December 2014. His lawyer told the press that with the possibility of parole for good behaviour after at least two-thirds of his sentence, Gobi would likely be released in 2024 after serving ten years out of his 15-year sentence.

== Counter lawsuits ==
After his second acquittal, Gobi filed a lawsuit against the prosecutors who prosecuted him in the original trial, claiming that the prosecution had "abused their powers and acted in bad faith by improperly performing a legal act which resulted in harm to the plaintiff", and have "breached their fundamental duties to assist in the administration of justice", but it was dismissed on 15 April 2021, based on the baseless and "entirely without merit" claims Gobi made in his lawsuit.

Not only that, Ravi accused the prosecution in charge of the 2018 appeal for being "overzealous" in prosecuting Gobi and causing him to serve wrongful detention on death row. The Attorney-General's Chambers refuted Ravi's claims because the appeal was correctly made in the right context at that time when the landmark ruling of Adili's case was not issued, and they demanded that Ravi retract his allegations and make an apology, but Ravi did not comply. As such, the AGC filed a disciplinary complaint to the Law Society of Singapore against him for possible professional misconduct. The disciplinary tribunal later dismissed a misconduct charge against Ravi as they find him making a contextually fair criticism of the prosecution's inconsistency between both their respective cases in Gobi's trial and their 2018 appeal, as attributed to the absence of the "Adili" landmark ruling in the previous court proceedings before Gobi's second acquittal, but the tribunal still made out a misconduct charge against Ravi since he claimed that the prosecution in charge of Gobi's case were the "wrongdoers" in his 2020 comments. The prosecution's appeal against the dismissal of Ravi's first charge of misconduct was rejected by the High Court on 12 May 2022. Subsequently, for the other charges of misconduct, Ravi was suspended from legal practice for five years since 22 March 2023.

Gobi was also involved in another lawsuit, for which he became involved while he was still on death row before his acquittal. The lawsuit was about the claims of the private letters between the death row inmates and both their lawyers and families were being forwarded from prisons to the AGC, and it led to these said inmates pursuing legal proceedings against the AGC or its members for alleged breaches of conduct to protect the inmates' rights, misconduct in public office and seeking damages for any harm caused by such. Gobi, together with 21 other death row inmates (most of whom sentenced for drug trafficking), were represented by M Ravi to seek the identities of whoever ordered or carried out the sending of the inmates' information to the AGC. The lawsuit was dismissed on 16 March 2021. The inmates, including Gobi, are ordered to pay $10 in costs for the lawsuit. Gobi and twelve of the other death row prisoners continued to bring the matter forward to the Court of Appeal, before Ravi withdrew the entire application. Ravi was later told to bear the S$10,000 in costs over this legal lawsuit.

== Release ==
Ten years after his arrest, Gobi Avedian was released from Changi Prison on 17 December 2024. He was granted an early release by parole on account of his good behaviour in prison.

== See also ==
- Capital punishment in Singapore
- Caning in Singapore
- Nagaenthran K. Dharmalingam
- Datchinamurthy Kataiah
- Pannir Selvam Pranthaman
