= Pannir Selvam Pranthaman =

Malaysian drug trafficker (1987–2025)

- Born: 31 July 1987; Ipoh, Perak, Malaysia
- Died: 8 October 2025 (aged 38); Changi Prison, Singapore
- Status: Executed by hanging
- Criminal charge: Drug trafficking
- Penalty: Death

Pannir Selvam a/l Pranthaman (31 July 1987 – 8 October 2025) was a Malaysian drug trafficker who was convicted of trafficking 51.84 grams (1.8 oz) of heroin at Woodlands Checkpoint in September 2014. Pannir, who was not certified as a drug courier, was sentenced to death in Singapore for his crime in May 2017. After his appeal was dismissed in February 2018, Pannir and his family submitted various clemency petitions, which were all rejected on 17 May 2019.

Pannir was originally scheduled to hang on 24 May 2019, but he managed to postpone his execution pending a last-minute appeal to challenge the decision to not pardon him and also the prosecution's decision to not certify him as a courier. This appeal ended in failure in February 2020, and also in November 2021. A second death warrant scheduled Pannir's execution for 20 February 2025, but it was delayed due to another appeal. After losing his final appeal, Pannir was executed by hanging in Changi Prison on 8 October 2025.

== Early life ==
Born on 31 July 1987 in Ipoh, Malaysia, Pannir Selvam a/l Pranthaman was the third child out of six children in an ethnic Malaysian Indian family. He had an older brother and sister, two younger brothers and a younger sister. Pannir's father Pranthaman Rajoo was a lorry driver and church pastor, while Pannir's mother Saratha Rajoo was a housewife. Being a Christian by birth, Pannir was educated at the Anglo-Chinese School in Ipoh. The family's financial situation was poor and they depended on Pannir's father's RM1,000 monthly church allowance, and Pannir worked during the school holidays to provide for his family.

In 2010, Pannir moved to Singapore, where he took up a job as a private security officer. He later enrolled at Stamford American International School (SAIS) as a part-time student in June 2013 to further his studies. Pannir also became a member of the Singapore Heart Foundation and MSQ Singapore.

== Trafficking of heroin and arrest ==
=== Capture and trial ===
On 3 September 2014, 27-year-old Pannir Selvam Pranthaman was arrested at Woodlands Checkpoint, as he was discovered carrying heroin in his possession while entering Singapore. A body search by Singapore authorities uncovered three packets of drugs taped to his groin area. During the initial interview, Pannir was uncooperative and answered "I don't know" to majority of the questions posted.

Under Singapore's Misuse of Drugs Act, anyone discovered to be illegally trafficking at least 15 grams (0.5 oz) of heroin at the time of their arrest will be hanged. He was in remand for three years before his trial began. The news of Pannir's arrest brought shock to Pannir's family, who did not notice anything amiss even though they knew he gambled, smoked and drank sometimes while in Singapore.

During his trial in the High Court, Pannir tried to mount a defence that he was a drug mule who acted on the orders of one "Anand" who offered him the job after losing huge sums of money to gambling. Anand told him that he should pass the drugs to a person called "Jimmy" (whose real name was Zamri Mohd Tahir), and promised that the proceeds were high, which could discharge his financial losses. He claimed that he did not know what are the contents he was delivering, and presumed them to be sex medicine, to which the prosecution argued that Pannir knew he was carrying the drugs and cited the inconsistencies of his statements and testimony.

Even though Pannir was acknowledged to be a drug mule, however, the prosecution did not issue a certificate of substantive assistance. His mental responsibility was not impaired according to psychiatric assessments at the time of the offence, which would not make Pannir eligible for life imprisonment either.

On 2 May 2017, Pannir was found guilty of drug trafficking by the High Court's judge Lee Seiu Kin. He was sentenced to the mandatory death penalty.

=== Appeal and clemency plea ===
The Court of Appeal heard Pannir's appeal and dismissed the appeal on 9 February 2018.

Pannir submitted a clemency petition, stating that he regretted his actions, and he hoped that he could live so that he could devote himself to Christianity and to teach others to not follow in his footsteps.

On 17 May 2019, President Halimah Yacob turned down Pannir's appeal for clemency on the advice of the Cabinet.

== Stay of execution ==
After the clemency appeal was declined, an execution notice was issued to Pannir's family on 17 May 2019, informing them that Pannir would be hanged on 24 May 2019. Pannir applied to delay his execution as he wanted to challenge the clemency outcome. Liew Vui Keong, Malaysia's law minister, wrote to the Singapore authorities to consider commuting Pannir's death sentence to life imprisonment.

On 23 May 2019, a day before he was due to hang, the Court of Appeal granted Pannir a stay of execution. Two Malaysian lawyers, Too Xing Ji and Lee Ji En, took on his case. When granting the stay of execution, the Court of Appeal noted that Pannir was told of the rejection for clemency and his execution date just one week in advance, not leaving him time to obtain legal advice on what options he had.

== Pannir's second appeal ==
When his appeal was heard, Pannir's lawyers argued that he should be given the certificate of substantive assistance by the Attorney General of Singapore, as he had given information about his alleged boss Zamri Mohd Tahir, who was arrested on 11 October 2014 (a month later than Pannir). He also argued that it was improper that he had been informed of his clemency rejection via letter on the same day he was issued his execution notice.

The overall arguments indicated that it was unconstitutional to send Pannir to the gallows and it would have been a breach of his rights to life.

However, the prosecution argued that the application by Pannir was unmeritorious, as it was clear from the evidence that, prior to 7 May 2019, the Cabinet had advised the President that the law should be allowed to take its course. The post-dated letters should not be sufficient to challenge the decision to not grant clemency to Pannir. Prosecutor Francis Ng noted that the use of such letters was not a legal requirement but issued as a matter of administration to notify interested persons of the outcome of the clemency process. Besides, Pannir only identified Zamri long after he was arrested, and in prosecuting Zamri, the prosecution did not have the assistance of the information from Pannir to allow them to successfully convict Zamri and send him to death row.

On 12 February 2020, Pannir's appeal was dismissed by judge See Kee Oon of the High Court. Pannir stated he would appeal against the appeal's dismissal to the Court of Appeal, but on 26 November 2021, Pannir's appeal was dismissed by the Court of Appeal of Singapore.

After the 2021 appeal verdict hearing, Pannir's lawyer Too Xing Ji told reporters that Pannir currently had not given any instructions on whether he will issue any more legal applications in his case. The lawyer reportedly shed tears over the verdict in Pannir's appeal. Pannir's family were also saddened at the verdict, but Pannir remained positive despite the outcome.

== Subsequent developments ==
=== Responses from Malaysia ===
In light of Pannir Selvam Pranthaman's scheduled execution and its subsequent postponement, there were increasing concerns that Singapore was giving unfair treatment to Malaysians arrested and sentenced to death row and execution for drug offences, as there were rising numbers of Malaysians among the drug traffickers executed in recent years. In response to these concerns, Singapore's law minister K Shanmugam argued that there is no inequality in treating foreigners and locals under the law for drug trafficking. He said the majority of Singaporeans favour the death penalty and it would be good for both sides if drug traffickers were caught by Malaysian authorities, as they could be dealt with according to Malaysia's laws (which also legalises execution for drug trafficking) and not have to worry about Singapore's capital punishment. Shanmugam emphasised that there should be no special treatment to Malaysian death row prisoners as it would undermine the integrity of Singapore's law.

In July 2019, letters allegedly written by Pannir circulated on the internet. The Singapore Prison Service rejected their authenticity and claimed that Pannir had earlier stated he did not write them, and stated that these letters were made up to orchestrate a campaign to further pressurise Singapore to spare Pannir's life. This was not accepted by N. Surendran, a Malaysian human rights lawyer who represented Pannir's family. The Attorney General's Chambers (AGC) also denied another allegation that they sent Surendran a threatening letter in relation to Pannir's case.

=== Poetry, songs and movie ===
During the time he was on death row, Pannir began to pen poems and song lyrics. The lyrics to two songs were used by some Malaysian musicians to compose songs. Pannir's first song "Arah Tuju", which was sung by Malaysian rapper Santesh Kumar and released in April 2021, highlighted the plight of death row inmates and called for forgiveness and mercy. The second song "Bukan Sekadar Hikayat", which was composed and sung by Malaysian rapper Samson Thomas (stage name Saint TFC) before its release in September 2021, was a tribute to Pannir's home country Malaysia and also to those who fought and made sacrifices for Malaysia over these past decades. The singers of both songs have expressed in the Malaysian news that they felt emotional about Pannir's lyrics which detailed his own emotions and they also came to view the issue of the death penalty from different perspectives. A third song penned by Pannir, titled "Di Sebalik Pintu Besi", was released in July 2022, with hip-hop artist Kidd Santhe and veteran singer Dj Dave collaborating to produce it. Pannir also contributed a poem to celebrate International Women's Day in March 2022.

In 2022, under the Freedom Film Festival a movie about Pannir’s case called Peluang Kedua (Second Chance) was released.

Pannir also wrote about his life on death row at Changi Prison and the impact it has on all the convicts, including him, who were awaiting their executions. On 27 April 2022, when drug trafficker Nagaenthran K. Dharmalingam was hanged at dawn, Pannir penned a poem titled Death Row Literature and dedicated it to Nagaenthran and mourned his death.

On 27 September 2025, Death Row Literature: A Collection of Poems by Pannir Selvam, was launched at an event at Gerakbudaya, Petaling Jaya.

=== Case impact on Pannir's family ===
Since 2020, due to the COVID-19 pandemic in Singapore, Pannir's family were unable to travel to Singapore to visit him while Pannir was on death row. While they acknowledged that Pannir was truly guilty and should be punished, Pannir's family also continued their search for new evidence, some of which they later provided to the authorities, to assist in Pannir's case in order to reopen his case and also rake up any possibilities for him to be spared the gallows and instead receive life imprisonment. Pannir also expressed to his sister that he wished that he can die in Malaysia, the country where he was born and grew up in and loved, and he did not want to face death in Singapore.

Due to Pannir's pending execution, his elder sister Sangkari and one of his younger sisters Angelia, having experienced their brother's case and its toll on their family, decided to become anti-death penalty activists in hope of bringing about more awareness about the death penalty and advocate for its abolition, as well as to ask for mercy for other death row convicts to give them second chances for rehabilitation and redemption. Sangkari was one of the activists asking for mercy on behalf of drug trafficker Syed Suhail Syed Zin, who was originally set to be hanged on 18 September 2020 before it was postponed due to a last-minute appeal to delay his execution. Suhail, who was sentenced in 2015 for trafficking 38.84 grams (1.4 oz) of heroin, lost his appeal in February and August 2021 respectively and was executed on 23 January 2025.

Angelia, who became the founder and later president of non-governmental organisation (NGO) Sebaran Kasih, was one of those who pleaded to the Singapore government to commute the death sentence of Nagaenthran K. Dharmalingam, who was convicted of importing over 42 grams (1.5 oz) of heroin in 2009, when the Singapore Prison Service informed Nagaenthran's mother that her eldest son will be executed on 10 November 2021. Nagaenthran's execution was suspended for five months due to an appeal and COVID-19 infection, and he was executed on 27 April 2022 after losing his final appeal. Angelia also made efforts to raise awareness about the death penalty, including a talk on 29 July 2022 when she promoted her brother's newest musical work and spoke up about the death penalty. She also planned to start a funding initiative titled Kitchen For Hope to provide financial help to the families of death-row inmates who were the sole breadwinners.

=== Lawsuit against Attorney-General ===
Pannir became one of the 24 death row prisoners to file a lawsuit against the Attorney-General of Singapore, claiming that there were miscarriages of justice and unfairness in their cases as they were denied access to legal counsel and had preparation of their appeals hindered, which made some inmates having to represent themselves in court without counsel to argue in their appeals. They stated that the court orders and fines made against lawyers for making baseless appeals had made lawyers fearful of reprisals from the courts and thus turned down the death row cases. However, on 3 August 2022, Pannir and the 23 others lost the lawsuit after the courts ruled that the allegations were not true, given that the lawyers had perfectly valid and legitimate reasons to not take up cases and cannot turn them down merely based on the court orders for the lawyers who had disciplinary problems and made baseless appeals.

=== Legal challenge against Pacc Act ===
In December 2023, Pannir was one of the 36 death row inmates who filed a legal motion to challenge the newly-enacted Post-Appeal Applications in Capital Cases Act (Pacc Act), which was designed to manage the last-minute appeals made by death row prisoners who exhausted all avenues of appeal. They argued that this law was discriminatory and would cut off the last chances of death row convicts' access to justice and also amounted to the unfairness of legal processes for these inmates. However, Justice Hoo Sheau Peng of the High Court dismissed the motion, citing that the law was implemented in light of the rising number of inmates filing last-minute appeals before their executions and abusing court processes, and its purpose was to sift out appeals that were made without merit. She also said that the law was not passed for enforcement yet, and the legal rights of the death row prisoners were not breached by the provisions set out by the Pacc Act. A follow-up appeal by the same 36 plaintiffs was dismissed by the Court of Appeal on 27 March 2024.

=== Legal challenge against LASCO ===
On 9 May 2024, Pannir and another 35 death row prisoners appealed to the High Court, arguing that the policy of the Legal Assistance Scheme for Capital Offences (LASCO) was not to assign counsel for death row inmates who filed further legal motions after exhausting their avenues of appeal against capital punishment and conviction, and this infringed the need to uphold fairness of court processes and constitutional rights of the prisoners, as well as breaching their access to justice and right to legal representation. However, 11 days after the appeal was filed, Justice Dedar Singh Gill found there was no reasonable cause of action and dismissed the motion, as the LASCO was "perfectly entitled to adopt or change its policy regarding its provision of legal aid", and there could have been multiple reasons for LASCO to not assign lawyers for such convicts, such as the need to allocate resources to aid new defendants who were facing trial and appeal and deter possible abuse of court processes. The judge also stated that the lack of representation from LASCO in post-appeal applications did not deprive the accused persons of their right to life or personal liberty, which was especially so since all the plaintiffs in this case were already convicted and sentenced at this stage, and also exhausted their appeals against conviction and/or sentence, and their rights to access to justice were not violated by the lack of free legal representation, given that they still had the entitlement to engage lawyers on their own accord in any post-appeal applications. Aside from this, Justice Gill said while the applicants should not be deterred from filing applications with merit to prevent the miscarriage of justice, but any motions launched "at an eleventh hour and without merit" should be regarded as a "stopgap" measure to delay the carrying out of the offender's death sentence. On these grounds, Justice Gill rejected the appeal.

=== Civil lawsuit ===
Pannir, together with 12 other death row inmates, launched a civil litigation against the Singapore Prison Service for releasing private letters to the Attorney-General's Chambers without the consent of the inmates who filed the motion. Pannir and the other plaintiffs argued that there was a case of prison correspondence misconduct, which involved the prison authorities sharing the letters of the plaintiffs with the AGC, and the inmates sought damages for unlawful practice, breach of confidence and copyright infringement.

On 11 October 2024, the Court of Appeal's three judges – Chief Justice Sundaresh Menon, Senior Judge Judith Prakash and Justice Steven Chong – ruled that the AGC and SPS unlawfully breached the confidentiality of letters from 13 death-row inmates. The judges emphasized the importance of prisoners' rights to maintain confidential correspondence, particularly with legal counsel. Although SPS and AGC justified their actions by stating they needed legal advice, the court found no need to share these letters. The court also upheld nominal damages for copyright breach but denied any compensation for breach of confidence.

=== Other developments ===
Pannir's sister Angelia Pranthaman told a Malaysian newspaper in May 2022 that the family faced massive financial burden due to the legal costs of Pannir's appeals and the regular need to travel from Malaysia to Singapore, and they hoped that Pannir and the other Malaysians on death row can be allowed to return to Malaysia to continue serving their remaining time on death row before their executions, so as to help themselves and other families avoid having to continue bearing the travel and legal expenses. Also, Angelia revealed that ever since the execution of Nagaenthran K. Dharmalingam in April 2022, Pannir and the other Malaysian prisoners were uneasy and uncomfortable about their imminent fates since the gallows was located nearby their death row cells in the same block. In another news update in February 2023, Angelia also added that she had to save up from her insurance agent job and depend on other family members to afford the expenses her regular trips to Singapore to visit Pannir at Changi Prison, and would also help Pannir pass on messages from the other Malaysian death row prisoners to their families who cannot visit them due to financial or health reasons. She was also worried that with the newly-enacted Foreign Influence (Countermeasures) Act (FICA), she would be prosecuted for being part of the foreign interference that attempted to meddle in Singapore's current affairs relating to the death penalty, which came under strong international condemnation for their executions of 11 drug criminals in 2022.

It was revealed by Law Minister K. Shanmugam on 3 September 2022 that after the executions of Kalwant Singh Jogindar Singh and Nagaenthran K. Dharmalingam, there were ten Malaysians (including Pannir) left on death row, and all of these remaining Malaysians were appealing for clemency while their executions were put on hold for the time being.

In December 2023, Pannir's family stated that they were still holding out hope for Pannir, whose civil lawsuit was set for hearing in February 2024. Pannir's sisters Angelia and Sangkari stated that they were gradually resigned to the imminent possibility that Pannir would be executed, and Pannir himself told his family to not worry about him if it was decided that he would hang, since he had become a better person and they all had already tried their best to save his life.

In an interview in February 2024, Pannir's former lawyer Too Xing Ji, as well as two other lawyers Ramesh Tiwary and Eugene Thuraisingam, spoke about the mental struggles of lawyers who regularly handled death penalty cases, given that these individuals had to bear the huge burden of helping people at risk of facing the gallows, and the prospect of losing a client to the gallows could be emotionally devastating. Speaking about the case of Pannir (without naming him directly), Too revealed that back in 2019, two weeks after he secured a stay of execution for Pannir, he broke down inside a taxi at the grave possibility of Pannir being executed, and Too's friend, who was also a passenger of the same taxi, had to console him. In his diary entry regarding this instance, Too wrote, "Acting for someone on death row, the inevitability of relating to him as a human being, had taken a gigantic emotional toll on me that was for all intents and purposes, invisible, undetectable until it bursts out in torrents of tears that were no longer mine to retain."

In December 2024, Pannir's family appealed to the Asean Intergovernmental Commission on Human Rights (AICHR) to intervene and pressurise Singapore to grant Pannir clemency.

== Second stay of execution ==
Since the loss of his appeal in November 2021, Pannir remained incarcerated on death row at Changi Prison, awaiting his execution.

On 4 February 2025, it was reported that Pannir was facing imminent execution in the near future, given that all his legal options were exhausted.

On 16 February 2025, Pannir's execution was scheduled to happen on 20 February 2025.

The Commonwealth Lawyers Association (CLA) lodged a statement on 19 February 2025, the eve of Pannir's scheduled execution, and asked the Singapore government to stay the execution of Pannir and urged the Singapore President Tharman Shanmugaratnam to commute Pannir's death sentence to life imprisonment. The association argued that the mandatory death penalty for drug trafficking was not in line with international human rights standards since drug trafficking did not fit the description of the "worst of the worst crimes". That same day, the Court of Appeal of Singapore granted a stay of execution, citing an ongoing constitutional challenge by other death row prisoners to a section under Singapore's drug law.

On 5 September 2025, Pannir lost his appeal to further stay his execution until the conclusion of a complaint he filed against his previous trial lawyers. The Court of Appeal found that this motion was not relevant enough to stay Pannir's execution, as the outcome would not have an effect on the conviction or sentence of Pannir.

== Execution ==
After his appeal was dismissed on 5 September 2025, Pannir was notified on 4 October that he was scheduled to be hanged on 8 October.

His lawyer, Too, filed for a stay of execution on 7 October, and the case was rejected by Singapore's Court of Appeal the following day. In a response to Malaysia MPs queries on the case, Malaysia Deputy Home Minister Shamsul Anuar Nasarah said that the Royal Malaysia Police had interviewed Pannir for four hours on 27 September in Changi Prison and found that the interview provided no new operational value to conduct further investigations. Furthermore, he added that Pannir was caught with drugs taped to his legs and groin, indicating that he was not just a courier.

Pannir was hanged in Changi Prison on 8 October.

== See also ==
- Abdul Kahar Othman – Singaporean drug convict executed in 2022
- Capital punishment in Singapore
- Cheong Chun Yin – Convicted drug trafficker sentenced to life imprisonment in Singapore
- Datchinamurthy Kataiah – Malaysian drug trafficker (1985–2025)
- Gobi Avedian – Malaysian and former death row prisoner jailed for drug offences in Singapore
- List of major crimes in Singapore
- Van Tuong Nguyen – Australian drug trafficker (1980–2005)
- Yong Vui Kong – Convicted drug trafficker sentenced to life imprisonment in Singapore
