= Execution of Nagaenthran K. Dharmalingam =

Execution of a Malaysian for drug trafficking in Singapore

Nagaenthran K. Dharmalingam
- Nagaenthran before his arrest in Singapore
- Born: Nagaenthran a/l K. Dharmalingam; 13 September 1988; Ipoh, Perak, Malaysia
- Died: 27 April 2022 (aged 33); Changi Prison, Singapore
- Cause of death: Execution by hanging
- Status: Executed
- Conviction: Drug trafficking
- Penalty: Death (x3)

Nagaenthran a/l K. Dharmalingam (13 September 1988 – 27 April 2022) was a Malaysian drug trafficker who was convicted of trafficking 42.72 grams of heroin in April 2009 upon entering Singapore from Malaysia at Woodlands Checkpoint with a bundle of heroin strapped to his thigh. Nagaenthran confessed to committing the crime, but gave statements claiming that he was ordered to commit the crime out of duress by a mastermind who assaulted him and threatened to kill his girlfriend and his family. He also claimed he did so to get money to pay off his debts before he later denied any knowledge of the contents of his bundle.

Nagaenthran was sentenced to death by hanging in November 2010. However, his execution was put on hold due to a moratorium placed on all hangings in Singapore pending judicial changes of the mandatory death penalty laws, which considered and approved the imposition of life imprisonment with or without caning for drug traffickers who were couriers or had mental illnesses. Despite Nagaenthran's multiple appeals, he was assessed as ineligible for re-sentencing because he was found not substantially mentally or intellectually disabled, which was also confirmed by the psychiatrists called upon by his lawyers.

Nagaenthran also lost his appeal for clemency, and he was finally scheduled to hang on 10 November 2021 after spending 11 years on death row. However, due to both a last-minute appeal and a COVID-19 infection, Nagaenthran's execution was suspended for five months, until the dismissal of his appeal on 29 March 2022. After this, Nagaenthran was hanged at Changi Prison on 27 April 2022; he was 33.

Prior to Nagaenthran's execution, his case attracted international attention, with many activists and foreign organizations asking for Singapore to commute Nagaenthran's death sentence to life imprisonment due to his alleged low IQ and overall, to abolish the death penalty while condemning Singapore for its use of the death penalty on drug traffickers. The government of Singapore, in response to these pleas, asserted that Nagaenthran was not substantially mentally or intellectually impaired and hence there was no basis for the government to intervene and commute Nagaenthran's death sentence.

== Background and early life ==
Nagaenthran a/l K. Dharmalingam, an ethnic Indian Malaysian and native of Ipoh, was born on 13 September 1988. He was the second of four children and had two younger brothers (one of them named Navinkumar) and an elder sister Sharmila. (Note: Some sources addressed her as Sharmila Dharmalingam) His father died sometime during Nagaenthran's death row imprisonment in Singapore.

According to the Anti-Death Penalty Asia Network's video interview of Nagaenthran's mother Panchalai Supermaniam, (Note: Her name was also spelt as Ranchalai Subramaniam, Panchalai Supramaniam or Panchalai Subramaniam) she often went out for work and had to entrust Nagaenthran and his siblings to the care of the children's grandmother and their relatives during his childhood. After Nagaenthran got older, Panchalai would be the one taking care of him but she did not speak to him much due to her work. Nagaenthran completed his five-year secondary school education at age 17 and he went to work at a factory.

Later, Nagaenthran decided to go to Singapore to find employment, against the wishes of his family, especially his mother who did not want him to leave his hometown for a distant place. Nagaenthran found a job as a security guard in Singapore and would regularly visit his family in Ipoh. According to his sister, he last returned to Malaysia and visited his family in 2008 during Deepavali, and this was the final time he stepped foot in his hometown before his arrest for drug trafficking.

== Arrest and trial ==
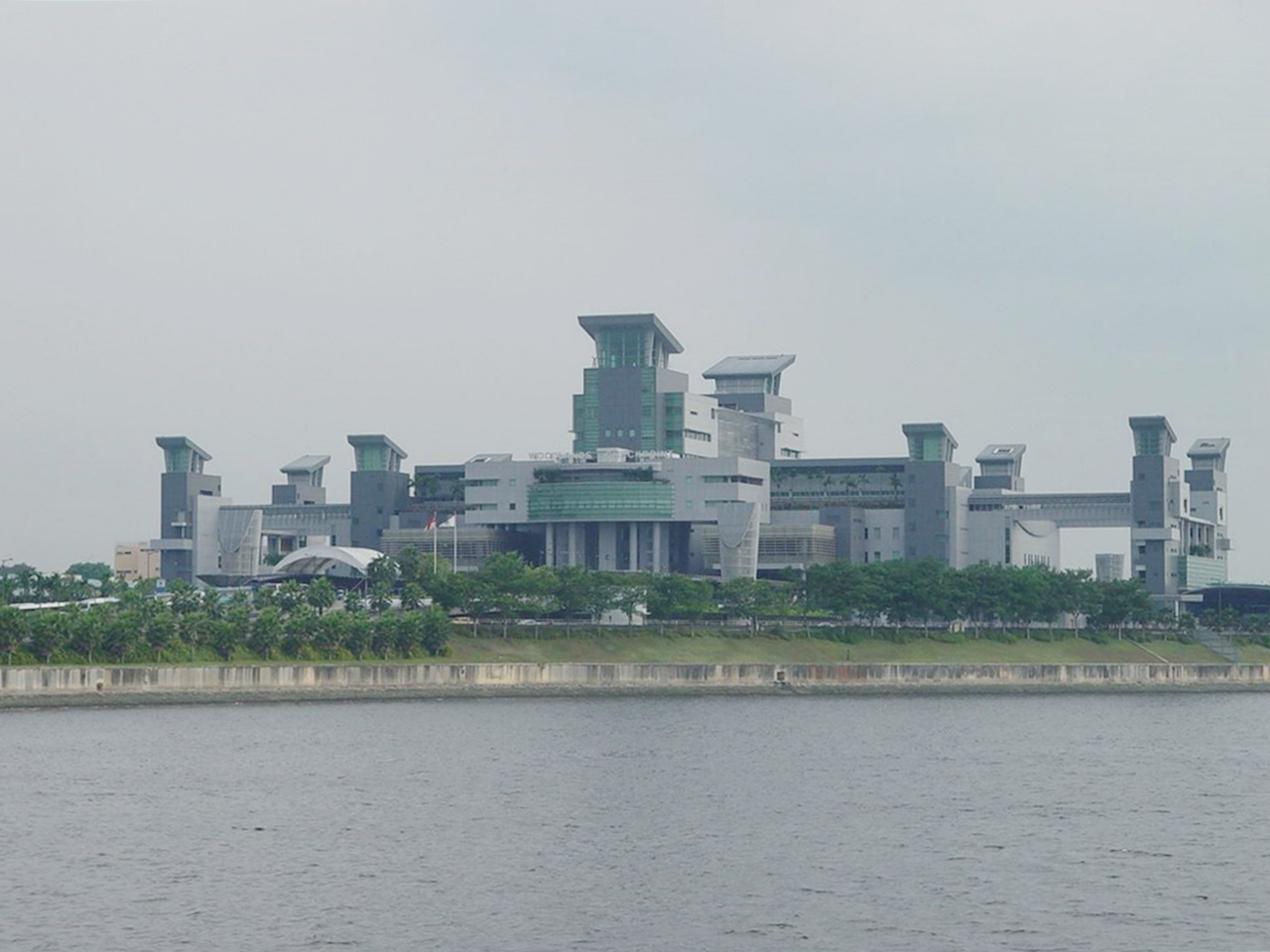
The Woodlands Checkpoint, where Nagaenthran was caught importing heroin as he entered Singapore from Malaysia.

On 22 April 2009, 20-year-old Nagaenthran was arrested by the Central Narcotics Bureau (CNB) officers when he was travelling from Malaysia to Singapore through the Woodlands Checkpoint. During a search of Nagaenthran and his belongings, the police discovered a bundle strapped to Nagaenthran's thigh, and the bundle contained a total amount of 42.72 g of diamorphine (pure heroin). A friend and travelling partner of Nagaenthran, named Kumarsen, was also arrested but later released. Upon his arrest, Nagaenthran admitted to his interrogators that he knew he was carrying drugs and it was for a Chinese friend, whom he called "King", who strapped the drugs to his thigh so that no one would find it. Nagaenthran also claimed that he needed money to pay off his debts and his father's heart surgery fees, which was why he committed the crime.

Later, Nagaenthran retracted his confession and denied having knowledge of the contents of the bundle of drugs found on him. He also later claimed that King had earlier assaulted him and threatened to kill his girlfriend should he not comply with King's demands to transport the drugs. Nevertheless, due to his arrest and the amount of heroin having exceeded the lower limit for the death penalty, 15 g, Nagaenthran was charged with capital drug trafficking, which, if found guilty, is punishable by death.

Nagaenthran was tried and found guilty on 22 November 2010 of drug trafficking and sentenced to death by hanging. The High Court's judge Chan Seng Onn did not accept Nagaenthran's defence that he was under duress at the time he committed the crime, and ruled that Nagaenthran should assume full responsibility of his criminal conduct, since he did so to discharge his debts. His appeal was dismissed on 27 July 2011 by the Court of Appeal's three judges Chan Sek Keong, V. K. Rajah and Andrew Phang.

== Appeals for re-sentencing ==
=== Legal changes and re-sentencing application ===
A year after Nagaenthran's appeal was dismissed, Singapore decided to amend its death penalty laws in July 2012, which designated a moratorium on all 35 executions in Singapore, including Nagaenthran's. The amendments, which took effect in January 2013, empowered all judges in Singapore with the discretion to sentence a drug trafficker to life imprisonment with caning not less than 15 strokes instead of death if he was merely a courier, on the condition that the public prosecutor issues the offender a certificate of substantive assistance — for helping the narcotics police to disrupt drug trafficking activities. Another alternative condition to receive life imprisonment was diminished responsibility; had any mental illnesses been diagnosed and found to have substantially impaired one's mental faculties, the offender would have been ineligible for the death sentence and caning would also not be given.

When the new death penalty laws took effect in January 2013, Nagaenthran applied for re-sentencing on account of clinical intellectual disability and mental illness, and his case was sent back to the original trial judge Chan Seng Onn for review in the High Court. However, a psychiatric report concluded that Nagaenthran had neither of the above. He was also not issued a certificate of substantive assistance by the CNB, since he did not substantively assist them in disrupting the drug trafficking activities. Despite this, on 24 February 2015, Nagaenthran brought forward the application and tried to ask for mercy based on the conditions of an intellectual disability, low IQ, impaired executive functioning and attention deficit hyperactivity disorder, which would have made him ineligible for the death penalty.

=== High Court reviews ===
In 2017, the High Court dismissed Nagaenthran's re-sentencing application. Four psychiatric and psychological experts, including one called by the defence, agreed that Nagaenthran was not intellectually disabled. The High Court also found that Nagaenthran had repeatedly changed "his account of his education qualifications, ostensibly to reflect lower educational qualifications each time he was interviewed". The High Court found that Nagaenthran showed that he was "capable of manipulation and evasion" during his offence, as Nagaenthran tried to dissuade Central Narcotics Bureau officers from searching him at the checkpoint by stating that he was "working in security", playing into the "social perception of the trustworthiness of security officers."

In 2018, the High Court dismissed another appeal of Nagaenthran's case.

==== Court of Appeal review ====
After the High Court dismissed Nagaenthran's appeal for re-sentencing, Nagaenthran, through his lawyer Eugene Thuraisingam, filed two separate appeals to ask for the Court of Appeal to commute his sentence under the newly enacted death penalty laws, but the five-judge Court of Appeal dismissed both appeals on 27 May 2019. The Court of Appeal said that there were numerous inconsistencies in Nagaenthran's account of his crime, which made it hard to rely on his defence given that they affected his credibility. The five judges - Sundaresh Menon, Belinda Ang, Andrew Phang, Judith Prakash, and Chao Hick Tin - held that Nagaenthran may have a low IQ, but his mental responsibility for his offence was not substantially impaired. He was able to plan and organise on simpler terms, and was relatively adept at living independently.

Besides, Nagaenthran had known that it was unlawful for him to import heroin, and hid the drugs to avoid detection. He was also prone to being manipulative and evasive, as shown from his initial attempts to avoid being searched before the narcotics officers arrested him in 2009. Additionally, he was earlier found to have done this with the intention of paying off some of his debts, and his actions were deliberate, calculated and purposeful, which was "the working of a criminal mind" and was able to weigh the benefits and risks, and the concept of right or wrong. Hence, Nagaenthran lost his final bid to be re-sentenced.

=== Clemency petition and first public attention ===
Nagaenthran later appealed to the President of Singapore Halimah Yacob for clemency, which would have commuted his sentence to life imprisonment if successful, but his plea was rejected on 1 June 2020, which finalized his death sentence. The last time clemency was granted in Singapore was in 1998, when 19-year-old Mathavakannan Kalimuthu was pardoned from execution despite being sentenced to hang for murdering a gangster in 1996. Mathavakannan was paroled and released in 2012 after serving 16 years of his life sentence due to good behaviour.

During the time Nagaenthran was appealing for clemency, his case attracted international attention and many who opposed the death penalty asked Singapore to spare Nagaenthran's life; Nagaenthran's mother Panchalai Supermaniam (aged 57 in 2019) and family also joined in the efforts to plead for mercy. In a 2019 news report, Malaysian human rights lawyer N Surendran denounced Singapore for unfairly subjecting a mentally disabled man to a death sentence, and he, together with Nagaenthran's new lawyer M Ravi argued that there was no fair trial for Nagaenthran since his defence's psychiatric evidence was allegedly not fully considered compared to the reports of the prosecution's psychiatrists.

Singapore's law minister K Shanmugam, in light of prior accusations that Singapore was unfairly mistreating Malaysian drug traffickers (due to the increasing number of Malaysians being executed for drug trafficking), argued that there is no inequality in treating foreigners and locals under the law for drug trafficking. He said the majority of Singaporeans favour the death penalty and it would be good for both sides if drug traffickers were caught by Malaysian authorities, as the offenders could be dealt with according to Malaysia's laws and not have to worry about Singapore's capital punishment. Shanmugam emphasised that there should be no special treatment for Malaysian death row prisoners as it would undermine the integrity of Singapore's law.

== Execution notice and stay of execution ==
=== Confirmation of execution date ===
Due to the COVID-19 pandemic in Singapore since January 2020, there was an informal moratorium on executions, including Nagaenthran's execution, possibly out of fear of spreading infections in Singapore's Changi Prison, where all death row inmates, including Nagaenthran, were held. This allowed Nagaenthran to live for at least one more year after his failed clemency appeal.

On 28 October 2021, in Nagaenthran's hometown in Ipoh, Nagaenthran's family received a letter (dated 26 October 2021) from the Singapore Prison Service (SPS), which informed them that Nagaenthran's execution date was scheduled on 10 November 2021. SPS also stated they will facilitate and help explain the travelling arrangements to any of Nagaenthran's family members on the necessary procedures on quarantine and COVID-19 tests, as well as allowing the family to have extended daily visits with a prolonged duration of a few hours and a maximum of five visitors per visit to curb possible risks of COVID-19 infection within the prison walls, due to Singapore's worsening rate of local transmission within the community (affected by the mutated Delta variant).

At the time Nagaenthran's death warrant was finalized, the last execution to be conducted in Singapore was on 22 November 2019, when 36-year-old Abd Helmi Ab Halim was executed for trafficking over 16g of heroin in 2015 despite appeals from Malaysia to commute his sentence.

=== Opposition to execution ===
Upon receiving news of the execution notice Malaysian lawyers and both international and local anti-death penalty activists - including World Coalition Against the Death Penalty, Human Rights Watch, Amnesty International, United Nations Commission on Human Rights, and FIDH - tried to appeal to the Singapore government for clemency. These organizations reiterated that Nagaenthran was mentally disabled and should not be hanged for his crime since he could not understand what he was going through, as well as insisting on his innocence. An online petition was made to plead to President Halimah Yacob to spare the Malaysian's life, garnering more than 102,000 signatures. There was an intention to bring forward the matter to the International Court of Justice (ICJ) against Singapore for not conforming with the international norms to not practice the death penalty. There are also concerns that Nagaenthran's execution might violate international human rights and law, which rules that any mentally unfit capital offenders should not be executed. In the United States, Divisions of Social Justice of the American Psychiatric Association (APA) called Nagaenthran's case a "flagrant breach" of human rights. Aside from this, there were repeated calls from these human rights groups to pressurize Singapore to abolish the death penalty.

Public figures like Singaporean rapper-musician Subhas Nair and British billionaire Richard Branson, appealed to Singapore for clemency on the execution. More than 200 friends and family members of other death row convicts (including those executed prior) like Angelia Pranthaman (sister of condemned drug trafficker Pannir Selvam Pranthaman) and the relatives of executed killer Kho Jabing, also asked for Singapore to show mercy on Nagaenthran. Protests were made outside Malaysia's Parliament at Kuala Lumpur for more efforts from the Malaysian government to stop the execution.

Nagaenthran's sister, Sarmila Dharmalingam, said she and her siblings had been delaying the news of their brother's execution from their mother, and did not provide any reasons why she had to travel to Singapore. They only told her five days after the letter arrived at Ipoh, and Nagaenthran's mother took the news badly. There were also diplomats sent by the Malaysian embassy to provide consular support for Nagaenthran's family, who arrived in Singapore with the help and funding of abolitionist advocate Kirsten Han and her activist group. Within a short span of two days, Han and her fellow activists managed to raise more than $14,000 for flights, quarantine hotel rooms and other arrangements, including a funeral, on behalf of Nagaenthran's family. This allowed Nagaenthran's mother to fly to Singapore to see her son for the first time in three years.

The execution date, six days after the annual Hindu festival Deepavali (which Nagaenthran and his family celebrated annually), was criticised; the family said that they could not celebrate the festival. A man was arrested on 4 November 2021 for displaying a poster advocating against Nagaenthran's death sentence at a train in Kuala Lumpur, which was classified as an illegal act of public provocation.

=== Government's response and further pleas for mercy ===
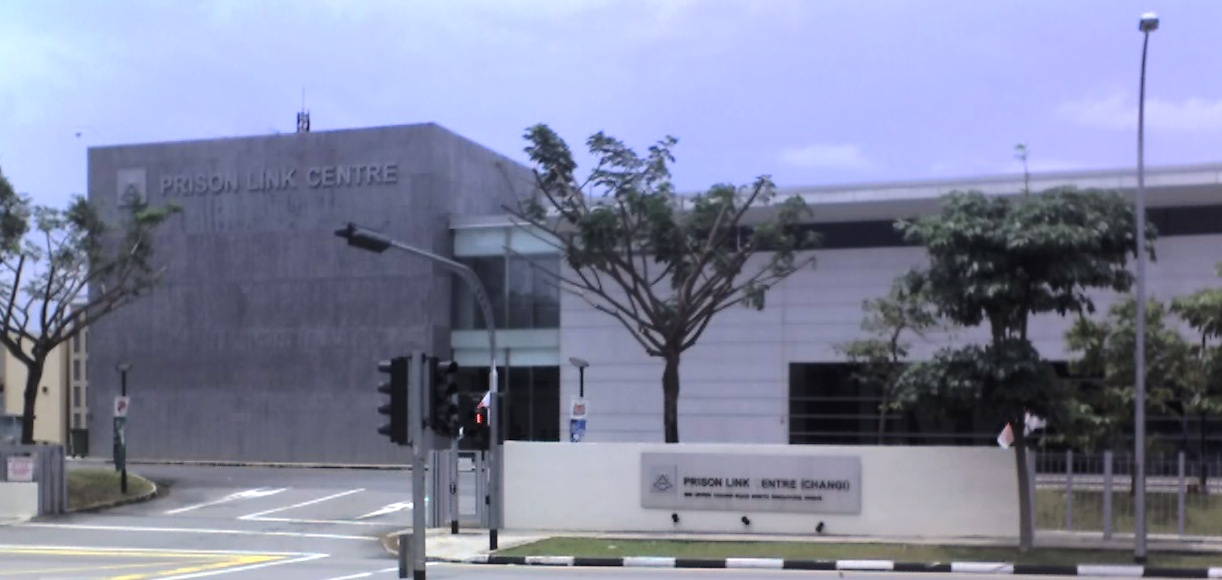
Changi Prison Complex, where Nagaenthran was held on death row

The Ministry of Home Affairs (MHA) later released a statement in view of the increasing pressure to spare Nagaenthran's life. They stated that he was accorded full due process under the law and was represented by legal counsel throughout. They also reiterated the main points of the final court verdict in relation to Nagaenthran's case, stating that Nagaenthran did not commit the act under duress, was not substantially mentally impaired to the extent of being ineligible for execution, and he clearly understood the magnitude of his actions, hence there was no necessity to review his case since his avenues of appeal were all exhausted. His execution date remained as scheduled on 10 November 2021, as confirmed by the MHA.

Singapore also emphasised that the death penalty is the reason why it has one of the lowest crime rates globally, and the practice is necessary to clamp down on drug crimes that can destroy thousands of lives potentially if not strictly regulated and deterred. MHA said the penalties, including the death penalty, for the illegal trafficking, importation or exportation of drugs are made clear at Singapore's borders, to warn traffickers and syndicates of the harsh penalties they potentially face. The Singapore authorities also revealed that they have also set execution dates ahead for some other death row inmates (who were all not named) who also exhausted all their avenues of appeal.

On 31 October 2021, Malaysian lawyer Mahajoth Singh had launched a one-man protest against the execution of Nagaenthran in front of the High Commission of the Republic of Singapore in Kuala Lumpur.

Malaysian lawyer N Surendran continued to ask for mercy on Nagaenthran's life, stating that there was no justification to execute Nagaenthran based on his mental disability in view of the government of Singapore's response to public pressure. Lawyers for Liberty from Malaysia condemned the Singapore government for their response to the pleas of mercy and ignorance of Nagaenthran's mental faculties. Prime Minister of Malaysia Ismail Sabri Yaakob appealed to Singapore's prime minister Lee Hsien Loong to review Nagaenthran's case and revoke his death sentence. Ismail stated he, as a lawyer, respects Singapore's law and does not want to interfere but he hoped that the authorities can give Nagaenthran a chance to review his case. Similarly, Saifuddin Abdullah, Malaysia's foreign minister, appealed to his Singaporean counterpart Vivian Balakrishnan to give their authorities a discretion in deciding clemency for Nagaenthran's case, but overall he maintained Malaysia's respect for Singapore's law. The European Union, which prohibits the death penalty among its member nations, also joined in to pressure Singapore to pardon Nagaenthran from the gallows.

=== Last-minute appeal and COVID-19 infection ===
A last-minute appeal was heard on 8 November, two days before Nagaenthran was due to hang, and M Ravi argued the appeal at the High Court. The appeal was dismissed by the High Court, as the judge See Kee Oon made it clear that the case had exhausted all its avenues of appeal since 2019 and hence there was no legal basis to not execute Nagaenthran, based on allegations that his mental state has deteriorated during his time on death row and thus made him ineligible for execution. There was also no medical basis to support the claim that Nagaenthran's mental age is below 18 years old since this was based on his lawyer's opinion. M Ravi has no medical expertise and met the Malaysian only once and interacted with him for just 26 minutes on 2 November 2021, six days before the appeal hearing. Justice See was also not convinced by Ravi's arguments regarding international law violations because of capital punishment, as he stated there is no legal basis for international law to take precedence over domestic law, concluding the appeal by stating that the law should take its course since Nagaenthran had already been accorded full due process and exhausted his appeals. An appeal to the Court of Appeal was also heard on 9 November 2021. The rushed schedule to close up on Nagaenthran's last-minute appeal process was criticised by lawyer N. Surendran as a denial of due legal process for Nagaenthran.

During the appeal hearing at the High Court, the testimonies of the prison officers who knew Nagaenthran were presented in court disputed the supposed mentally ill behaviour of Nagaenthran. A senior prison officer who had befriended Nagaenthran for the past three years had not seen any abnormal behaviour from Nagaenthran, who was able to request religious counselling after being told that he would be hanged in the near future. Another prison officer said Nagaenthran had no problem communicating with the prison officers in English, Malay and Tamil, making requests and responding to instructions. Not only did he ask for religious counselling and a DVD player to play religious songs, Nagaenthran was also able to request phone calls to his family members and for them to visit him, as well as selecting whichever prison officers who could help fulfill his needs during the final days prior to his execution. The Attorney-General's Chambers (AGC) earlier requested to Nagaenthran's lawyer to allow them to disclose the latest psychiatric records detailing Nagaenthran's mental state, but Ravi objected to the disclosure.

On 9 November, the day of the appeal at the Court of Appeal, Malaysia's Communications and Multimedia minister Annuar Musa expressed to Singapore his hope that they could reconsider Nagaenthran's case and spare his life. At the same time, the human rights experts of the United Nations also pushed for Singapore to spare Nagaenthran's life.

However, on 9 November 2021, it was reported that Nagaenthran had tested positive for COVID-19 just 12 minutes after he arrived at the Court of Appeal for his appeal hearing, and thus the execution on 10 November would not proceed as scheduled. Both Ravi and the prosecutor Wong Woon Kwong were informed of this by one of the judges in a courtroom packed with both local and international media and activists. His appeal was also delayed to allow Nagaenthran time to recover before proceeding with the appeal process. The appeal was heard by three judges: Andrew Phang, Judith Prakash and Kannan Ramesh.

The next day on 10 November, the original date of Nagaenthran's execution, the Singapore Prison Service revealed that prior to his appearance in court, Nagaenthran did not report any symptoms and was initially tested negative by the ART test before the results of the PCR test confirmed Nagaenthran's COVID-19 infection. It was also revealed that Nagaenthran chose not to vaccinate himself from COVID-19, even though more than 90% of the prison staff and 90% of the prisoners were fully vaccinated from the virus. Several prison officers and some of Nagaenthran's fellow prisoners at the death row cells of Changi Prison's Institution A1 were also subsequently tested positive, and the affected death row cells were undergoing lockdown to avoid the infection from spreading. Nagaenthran and the people he interacted with were isolated to avoid spreading infection to more people and be given medical treatment in the meantime. There would also be measures taken to ensure regular testing of both prison staff and inmates for COVID-19. In addition to 54 supervising prison officers, a total of 169 prisoners from the prison, including those on death row, were confirmed to be infected as of 12 November 2021.

=== Further death penalty debate and Singapore's response ===
The case has brought light to the issue of the death penalty in Malaysia. While many human rights groups pushed for abolition of the death penalty, most Malaysians believed that the death penalty should remain for serious crimes like murder and certain offences of corruption other than drug trafficking, and support for the death penalty remains high in Malaysia despite the decreasing numbers of new death sentences given by the courts. Legal professionals and enforcement, including some lawyers and police officers, commented that there should be some powers of discretion given to the judges to impose life imprisonment in some capital cases instead of death with respect to its mitigating circumstances, but they generally felt that the death penalty is overall still relevant to use against drug trafficking and murder and other offences, given the rampant rate of drug offences committed in Malaysia. Datuk Seri Nazri Abdul Aziz, who was debating the Budget 2022 in Dewan Rakyat, brought up the case of Nagaenthran and hopes that Malaysia can review its death penalty laws for drug traffickers in Malaysia, given that it also executed many drug offenders while appealing for mercy on its citizens in other countries, which was inconsistent with their stance towards drug convicts in and out of Malaysia.

In light of the growing pressure by the United Nations (UN) to pardon Nagaenthran, Singapore's representative to the UN and Ambassador Umej Bhatia responded and highlighted that the courts in Singapore has already made it clear in their verdicts that Nagaenthran may have borderline intellectual functioning but he did not have mild intellectual disability, and they also gave their strictest due consideration to determine the eligibility of Nagaenthran's condition for execution, and even Nagaenthran's personal psychiatrist has also agreed that the Malaysian had no intellectual disability. With regards to the UN's accusations that Singapore had violated international law by imposing death sentences on drug offenders who committed "non-serious" crimes by international standards, Singapore stated there was no international consensus on the death penalty or what was the threshold of "serious crimes", and every country has the sovereign right to decide on its use of the death penalty and the types of capital offences they defined under the law.

When facing the UN's other allegations that the fate of a drug offender were decided by the prosecution of Singapore and the unfairness towards Nagaenthran's family with a long list of strict rules of COVID-19 travel regulations, Singapore rebutted it by stating that the prosecution's decisions are independent of the government and they are still liable for review of their decisions, which Nagaenthran has already appealed for before the courts found no error after reviewing the prosecution's decisions. The COVID-19 travel restrictions and rules were not discriminatory towards Nagaenthran's family, as they were all similar to the ones which apply to all travellers entering Singapore from Malaysia during this period, and were made to address the present pandemic situation in Singapore, and the authorities made efforts to contact the family to allow them to understand the travel regulations and facilitate their stay in Singapore.

On 12 November 2021, Singapore's Ministry of Foreign Affairs also revealed that the ministers in Singapore, including Prime Minister of Singapore Lee Hsien Loong and Foreign Minister Vivian Balakrishnan, had responded to their respective Malaysian counterparts that Nagaenthran was being accorded full due process under the law and was not intellectually disabled as confirmed by the courts and psychiatric assessments, hence there should be no intervention in his case. In response to the government's statements, Malaysia's human rights lawyer N. Surendran and Lawyers for Liberty claimed that the Singapore government was fabricating their stand that Nagaenthran was accorded full due process, stating that the courts had not given Nagaenthran a full due court process by not taking into consideration of his intellectual and mental impairment or making accommodation to address them during the court proceedings. Human Rights Watch's senior disability rights expert Emina Ćerimović commented on Nagaenthran's case, "The inhumanity shown by the Singaporean authorities in Nagaenthran's case is truly shocking." Ćerimović also added, "The government's determination to execute a man with an intellectual disability for importing a small amount of drugs is disproportionate and cruel, and deserves global condemnation."

=== Further appeals from Malaysia and other parties ===
The Malaysian Bar, together with the Advocates Association of Sarawak and the Sabah Law Society, also activated their efforts to appeal to the Singapore government for clemency to lower Nagaenthran's death sentence to life imprisonment. They cited that they maintain their respect for Singapore's laws but implored the city-state, on the basis of compassion and humanity, to assess Nagaenthran's mental state to see if he is mentally competent to be hanged due to their concerns of the possible psychological impact that his 11-year death row period had on him. Both Nagaenthran's family and lawyer M Ravi expressed on 18 November that they will sue Singapore's attorney general Lucien Wong for negligence and willful disregard of human life by the judicial system. Wong sent a letter to Ravi, stating that Ravi's other allegations against the legal system in Nagaenthran's case amounted to "contempt of court" and he should retract them and apologise by a deadline of 22 November. However, Ravi has stated that he will not retract his statements or apologise to the attorney general.

On 23 November 2021, Yang di-Pertuan Agong Abdullah of Pahang reportedly wrote to the President of Singapore, hoping that clemency could be given to Nagaenthran.

On 26 November 2021, the Court of Appeal of Singapore was to give its verdict regarding Nagaenthran's final appeal four days later on 30 November. However, the court date was postponed to sometime in January 2022, according to activist Angelia Pranthaman, whose brother Pannir Selvam was on death row for drug offences. She appealed to Singapore to spare the lives of both Nagaenthran and her brother and commute their death sentences. However, Nagaenthran's lawyer M Ravi, who requested the adjournment, stated there was no definite date confirmed as the courts did not inform him of a new court hearing date. The adjournment was a result of Ravi's suspension from his legal duties in view of his relapse from bipolar disorder.

On 3 December 2021, the President of Singapore Halimah Yacob replied to the Agong's clemency letter, firmly stating that Nagaenthran was being 'accorded full due process under the law' and thus refused to grant clemency to Nagaenthran.

The next court date for Nagaenthran's appeal was set for 24 January 2022. The case would be heard by a five-judge panel comprising Chief Justice Sundaresh Menon, Judges of Appeal Andrew Phang, Judith Prakash and Belinda Ang, and Senior Judge Chao Hick Tin. Nagaenthran's lawyer M Ravi was also replaced by Violet Netto. As Nagaenthran's appeal hearing was drawing near, concerned members of the international community, including British actor Stephen Fry, continued to appeal to Singapore to spare the 33-year-old Malaysian from the gallows.

== Final appeals and second execution notice ==
=== Last court hearing ===
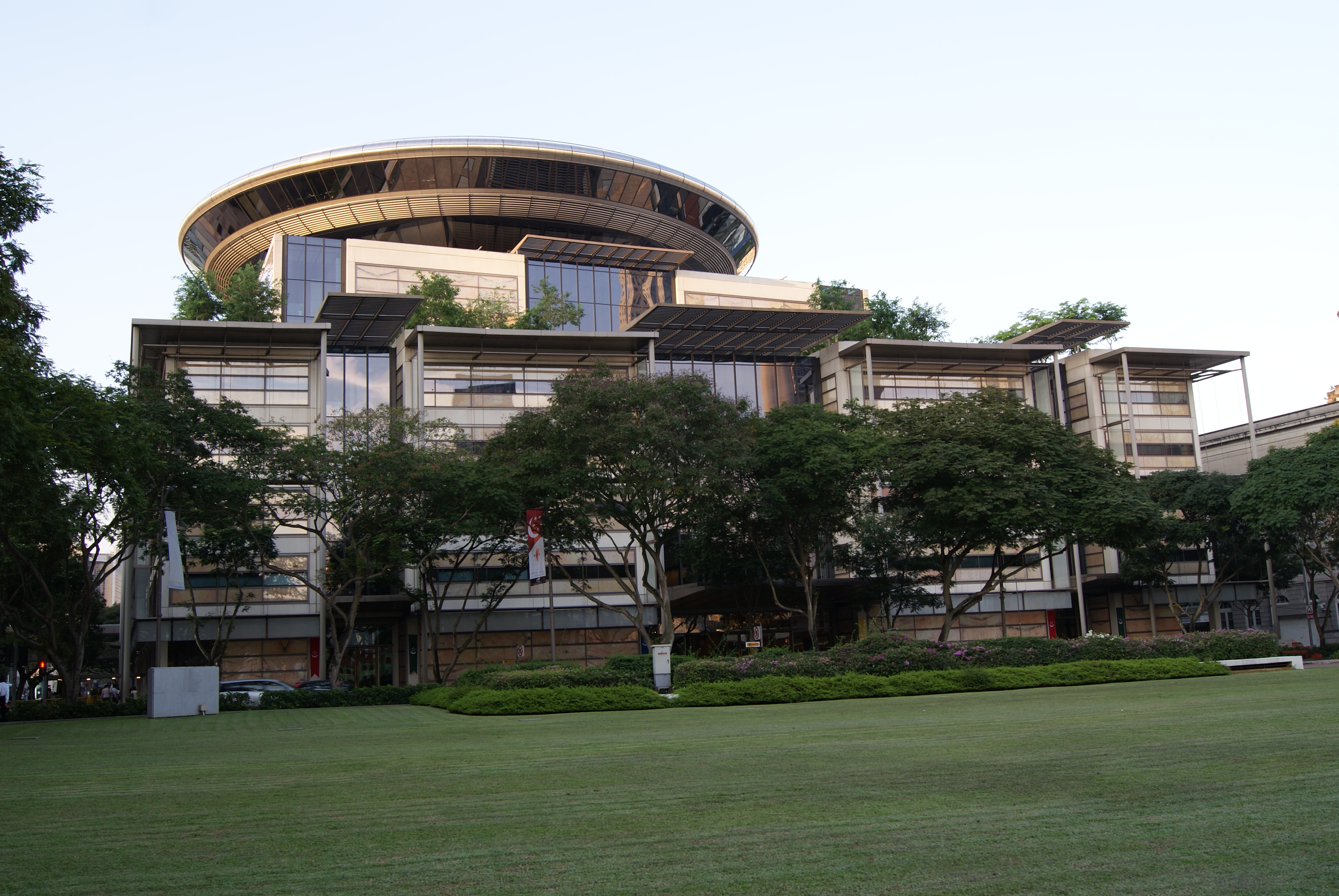
The Supreme Court of Singapore, where Nagaenthran's final appeal was heard by its higher division – known as the Court of Appeal.

On 24 January 2022, Netto sought an adjournment of the appeal, and it was granted by the courts. The appeal was eventually heard on 1 March 2022, in which Netto argued for Nagaenthran to be subjected to psychiatric assessment prior to his execution to assess whether he should be considered mentally fit to undergo his hanging. Netto also tried to admit the reports of two foreign psychologists as evidence to support Nagaenthran's case. However, the judges stated that the last-minute drip-feeding of evidence were tantamount to an abuse of the court process. Deputy Public Prosecutor Wong Woon Kwong described the appeal as a "continuation of a very cynical attempt to abuse the process of the court" and criticized Netto for seeking to suppress the prison's independent medical records. The judgement was reserved, and while awaiting the verdict, the rights groups continually sought clemency for Nagaenthran, who still remained at Changi Prison awaiting his fate.

Four weeks later, on 29 March 2022, the five-judge Court of Appeal dismissed the appeal, and they issued harsh words of condemnation and criticism towards Netto and M. Ravi for abusing the court process. As he delivered the verdict on behalf of the judges, Chief Justice Sundaresh Menon pointed out that the appeal was filed based on inadmissible evidence and Ravi's own "self-serving" speculation that Nagaenthran has a mental age below 18 years old; there was no evidence to show any deterioration of Nagaenthran's mental faculties during his 13-year stay on Changi Prison's death row. The Court, relying on the findings of the trial court, accepted that Nagaenthran possessed borderline intellectual functioning but not mild intellectual disability. The two foreign psychologists' evidence was rejected as they did not personally assess Nagaenthran.

Chief Justice Menon further pointed out that the Attorney-General's Chambers had intended to enter psychiatric and medical reports from check-ups done on Nagaenthran in 2021 as evidence in court, but Nagaenthran's lawyers objected on the grounds of medical confidentiality, preventing the reports from being used as evidence. Menon questioned how Nagaenthran could withhold evidence regarding his medical condition after "having called his medical condition into question". Menon inferred that Nagaenthran was "seeking to prevent the court from accessing that evidence because he knows or believes it would undermine his case".

Menon reprimanded the lawyers for mounting a baseless legal challenge against Nagaenthran's death penalty, which he described as "without merit" and an attempt to escape from death and defer his imminent execution. He also reiterated that it was improper to engage in or encourage last-minute attempts to reopen any concluded appeals without a reasonable basis, and as long as the capital punishment was imposed legally in the specified circumstances, it is intolerable for a defence counsel to repeatedly launch hopeless appeals and bring the justice system into disrepute.

Menon also stated in the appeal verdict:

In our judgment, these proceedings constitute a blatant and egregious abuse of the court's processes. They have been conducted with the seeming aim of unjustifiably delaying the carrying into effect of the sentence imposed on the appellant.

Having lost his final chance to have his death sentence commuted, 33-year-old Nagaenthran was set for imminent execution. Nagaenthran's family were reportedly devastated and shocked to hear the appeal's dismissal.

=== Second clemency appeal and outcome ===
In the aftermath of the appeal's dismissal, many civil groups still tried to appeal to Singapore to commute Nagaenthran's sentence and show him mercy. Maya Foa, director of UK-based anti-death penalty group Reprieve, made a statement to Singapore's President Halimah Yacob, "We urge President Halimah Yacob to listen to the cries for mercy within Singapore and around the world, from the United Nations to global business leaders, and spare the life of this vulnerable man." Lawyers for Liberty (LFL) also accused the government of Singapore for violating international law and they also claimed that by sentencing Nagaenthran to death, Singapore had failed to abide by the conditions of prohibiting the killing of intellectually disabled persons. Together with M Ravi, LFL asked the Malaysian government to bring forward Nagaenthran's case to the International Court of Justice (ICJ).

The Global Commission on Drug Policy, citing the case of Nagaenthran, stated that the death penalty was an inappropriate response to any offences, including drug-related crimes. A protest was also made on 3 April 2022 at Hong Lim Park against the government's use of the death penalty in light of Nagaenthran's failed appeal. Besides, the ASEAN Intergovernmental Commission on Human Rights (AICHR) was urged to intervene in Nagaenthran's case and other death penalty issues from Singapore, as well as advocate for the abolition of the death penalty in the ASEAN member nations.

While some citizens felt that Nagaenthran should be spared from the gallows and the death penalty should be removed, others agreed with and supported the judges' standing that Nagaenthran clearly knew the magnitude and consequences of his crime and stated he should face execution for his crime. Earlier in the same month Nagaenthran lost his appeal, a 2021 survey result was publicly revealed and it showed that more than 80% of Singaporeans believed that the death penalty should remain in Singapore due to its deterrent effect and relevance in fighting crime.

M Ravi told the reporters that due to the complete exhaustion of avenues of appeal on Malaysia's part, no more appeals would be lodged and the execution could take place in days, but he continued to express his support for Nagaenthran's life to be spared. The concern that Nagaenthran's execution would take place soon was further intensified when 68-year-old Changi Prison inmate Abdul Kahar bin Othman, a Singaporean drug convict, was confirmed to be executed at dawn on 30 March 2022, making Abdul Kahar the first person to be hanged in Singapore during the COVID-19 pandemic.

On 16 April 2022, rights advocate Kokila Annamalai revealed in a Malaysian newspaper that a second clemency appeal submitted by Nagaenthran's family and supporters was rejected by the President of Singapore on 31 March 2022. Having personally witnessed the tender, loving moments between Nagaenthran and his family members during their prison visits and court session, Annamalai shared her sadness towards Nagaenthran for his imminent fate and she stated that there should be more to be done regarding the issue of capital punishment in Singapore, and criticized the country for a lack of mercy on Nagaenthran. The Guardian and Malaysian newspapers also confirmed that Nagaenthran's death sentence was upheld by the dismissal of his second clemency plea, and Ravi criticized the decision to reject clemency on Nagaenthran.

=== Second death notice ===
On 20 April 2022, the Singapore Prison Service (SPS) informed Nagaenthran's mother that her son's execution was rescheduled to take place on 27 April 2022, and that extended daily visits would be facilitated for the family until the eve of his execution. This announcement led to requests for the Malaysian government to delay Nagaenthran's execution by taking the case to the International Court of Justice (ICJ). Upon receiving her son's second execution notice, Nagaenthran's mother Panchalai Supermaniam appeared on Facebook in a video clip, in which she made a public apology on behalf of her son, and she begged for mercy on behalf of Nagaenthran's life.

By then, Amnesty International also filed a petition to seek clemency on behalf of Nagaenthran, and the petition itself garnered more than 8,000 signatures. Rights activist Kokila Annamalai was set to organize a candlelight vigil on behalf of Nagaenthran at Hong Lim Park on 25 April 2022, and Nagaenthran's family and three siblings prepared to travel to Singapore to visit him in Changi Prison. British billionaire Richard Branson and British actor Stephen Fry, who both earlier appealed for mercy on Nagaenthran's life, once again went to social media to reiterate their pleas for Nagaenthran's sentence be commuted. Additionally, in his appeal for mercy on behalf of Nagaenthran, Branson described the death penalty as a "horrible blotch" on the reputation of Singapore as a huge financial hub. Human rights groups also asked Singapore to transfer Nagaenthran to a Malaysian prison on a prisoner exchange programme to allow him to be executed in Malaysia instead of Singapore.

The protests against Nagaenthran's execution grew fiercer as the execution notice of Datchinamurthy Kataiah, another Malaysian drug convict on death row, was also finalized and his execution date scheduled on 29 April 2022, two days after Nagaenthran's execution date. The vigil was held as scheduled, with several public figures like rapper Subhas Nair, opposition politician Paul Tambyah and writer Alfian Sa'at attending the vigil. Some Singaporeans showed up out of sympathy for Nagaenthran and Datchinamurthy, while others joined only to find out more about the concept of the death penalty in Singapore.

Nagaenthran's family were unable to attend the vigil since the law prohibits the participation of foreigners in local protests, but on behalf of the family, Nagaenthran's cousin Thenmoli Sunniah stated that the family would not give up their hope for Nagaenthran's case, since they planned to file another legal application to the courts. Datchinamurthy's family similarly stood by Nagaenthran's family to show support for the vigil and protest against the two men's executions. It was also revealed that both Datchinamurthy and Nagaenthran were close friends while staying next to each other in neighbouring cells at the death row section of Changi Prison, and both men's mothers bonded due to their loss and common goal to save their sons from execution.

Sebaran Kasih, a non-governmental organization, appealed for all political and business leaders to bring forward diplomatic measures to intervene in Nagaenthran's case, and they cited the 2010 cases of Cheong Chun Yin and Pang Siew Fum to question why Nagaenthran cannot be eligible for life imprisonment like both Cheong and Pang since their cases were similar in terms of their circumstances. Cheong and Pang were both initially sentenced to death for drug trafficking in 2010 before the 2013 law reforms allowed them to have their sentences commuted to life, the former due to him being a certified courier and the latter due to her mental illness. A protest was made by Malaysian activists, lawyers and members of the Malaysian Indian Congress (MIC) outside the Singapore High Commission in Malaysia to show opposition to Nagaenthran's execution. However, as a result of this protest, the Royal Malaysia Police sent out officers to take three lawyers into custody for questioning regarding their roles in the protest.

The United Nations Human Rights Office also issued an official statement, in which they showed opposition to the Singapore government's decision to proceed with the executions of both Nagaenthran and Datchinamurthy due to their concern that Singapore may conduct more executions in the near future with the increasing phenomenon of execution notice issued for drug convicts on death row, and they urged Singapore to reconsider their drug laws and use of the death penalty in the city state.

=== Lawsuit against Sundaresh Menon ===
On 25 April 2022, Nagaenthran's mother Panchalai Supermaniam filed a lawsuit against Sundaresh Menon, the current Chief Justice of Singapore, as a final attempt to help her son escape the gallows. In the lawsuit, which she made with the help of family members, activists and friends, she alleged that Menon was the same attorney general who, prior to his appointment as Chief Justice, prosecuted Nagaenthran and secured his conviction, which she claimed was a move that "blatantly" deprived her son's rights to a fair trial. However, Panchalai did not have a lawyer to represent her in filing the application since none of the lawyers in Singapore were willing to represent her for fear of any reprisals from the court, as the courts would often issue hefty fines and other penalties for any legal applications filed without merit. Hence, Panchalai would be representing herself in the hearing, which was set for the next day and also the day before Nagaenthran's execution.

On 26 April 2022, the day before Nagaenthran's execution, the Court of Appeal dismissed Nagaenthran's mother's lawsuit. The three-judge panel, consisting of Supreme Court judge Belinda Ang, and two Judges of Appeal Andrew Phang and Judith Prakash, overall found the application to be "devoid of merit". Justice Phang, who delivered the verdict, described in his own words that "no court in the world would allow an applicant to prolong matters ad infinitum" by filing applications that were baseless and without merit. He also stated: "There must come a time when the last word of the court is the last word." Justice Phang added that Nagaenthran did not raise this allegation in his previous appeal the month before, which made the application look like a "calculated attempt" to downplay the finality of the court process.

Deputy Public Prosecutor (DPP) Wong Woon Kwong harshly criticized Nagaenthran's mother for filing a meritless lawsuit, and he stated that CJ Menon was not involved in any of the decisions pertaining to Nagaenthran's prosecution, hence the lawsuit was a sign of the continuation of abuse of the court process by Nagaenthran through the involvement of external parties. DPP Wong also urged the court to compel Nagaenthran's mother to disclose the identities of those who played a part in submitting the lawsuit, so as to "stem the continued attacks on the fundamental administration of justice."

Following the dismissal of this lawsuit, Nagaenthran, who accepted the verdict, made a final request to the Court of Appeal, being quoted as saying: "I'd like to make a last-minute request to spend some time with my family members. I'm placing this request so I can hold my family members' hands. Here in court, Your Honour, I would like to hold my family members' hands, not in prison. May I please have permission to hold their hands here?"

After making the request, the three judges allowed Nagaenthran to spend two hours together with his family in the Supreme Court building and he was given permission to hold their hands one final time. As the time was up, Nagaenthran reportedly shared a tearful farewell with his family before he was brought back to Changi Prison, where his execution would take place.

Upon the news of his lawsuit's rejection, a small vigil was held by activists in Malaysia on the night before his execution. Fifty people attended the event, and there were two Malaysian lawyers being probed by the police for taking part in the vigil. Lawyers for Liberty also accused the Singapore authorities of "harassing" and "intimidating" Nagaenthran's mother into revealing the names of those who assisted her into filing the lawsuit, claiming the intention of such aid were made out of compassion for a helpless mother desperate to save her child.

== Execution ==
Thirteen years after his arrest for drug trafficking, on 27 April 2022, at around dawn, Nagaenthran was hanged at Changi Prison. He was the second death row prisoner to be executed in Singapore after Abdul Kahar Othman, who was the first to be hanged after the end of Singapore's two-year moratorium due to the COVID-19 pandemic in Singapore. Nagaenthran was the fifth Malaysian drug trafficker to be hanged in Singapore since 2016.

According to Nagaenthran's 22-year-old brother Navinkumar, his family would collect his brother's body and take it back to their hometown in Ipoh for funeral preparations. Nagaenthran's 36-year-old sister Sharmila said that the family was saddened and shocked at their loss, and they were dissatisfied with Nagaenthran's final sentence despite coming to terms with his death. The funeral was expected to be held on 29 April 2022, two days after Nagaenthran's execution. A wake was conducted for Nagaenthran in Singapore before the body was brought back to Malaysia, with over a hundred people attending it, including human rights activists, family members, and members of the public. Nagaenthran's sister revealed that after the funeral, Nagaenthran's remains would be laid to rest in a Hindu cemetery in Buntong, Ipoh. Over 200 family members and friends were present at the funeral. Reportedly, Sharmila did not allow a single politician to attend the funeral, claiming they're coming only for publicity but did not offer assistance while Nagaenthran was on death row.

In the year 2022 itself, a total of eleven executions, including Nagaenthran's, were officially carried out in Singapore, all for drug trafficking.

== Aftermath ==
=== Criticism of the execution ===
Reprieve's director Maya Foa criticized the execution and described Nagaenthran as a "victim of a tragic miscarriage of justice". M Ravi offered his condolences to the family and said he would continue to fight for the abolition of the death penalty in Singapore. Activist Kirsten Han also offered her condolences by posting a photo of Nagaenthran wearing his favourite clothes, which was the final photo taken before his death. The Malaysian government also received calls from related parties to abolish the death penalty in light of Nagaenthran's execution, with PKR leader and deputy chief Jimmy Puah Wee Tse describing it as an irrelevant punishment due to it not being effective in reducing crime. Wisma Putra also offered their condolences to Nagaenthran's family and provided them consular support.

Additionally, British billionaire Richard Branson, who earlier appealed for clemency in Nagaenthran's case, offered his condolences to Nagaenthran's family and he expressed his disappointment in Singapore for its "relentless machinery of death" since it left "no room for decency, dignity, compassion, or mercy" when it sent Nagaenthran to the gallows in spite of the growing opposition to his execution. The Anti-Death Penalty Asia Network (Adpan) condemned the execution and stated that Nagaenthran's execution was a violation of international law by the Singapore government. Director Erwin van der Borght of Amnesty International commented that the execution of Nagaenthran was a "disgraceful act" which was "ruthlessly carried out" by the Singapore government despite the widespread international outcry and protests.

Australian human rights lawyer Julian McMahon, who formerly represented drug traffickers Andrew Chan and Myuran Sukumaran of the Bali Nine (executed in 2015 by firing squad in Indonesia), and Van Tuong Nguyen (executed in 2005 by hanging in Singapore), spoke up against the issue of the death penalty in light of Nagaenthran's execution. McMahon stated that he felt that the death penalty was ineffective in preventing drug trafficking given the offenders dealt with were just the runners but not the kingpins, and he added that it was shocking to see the death penalty being put into use for relatively "non-serious" crimes like drug trafficking.

Another Australian lawyer Morry Bailes was also critical of the use of the death penalty by both Singapore and Japan in light of Nagaenthran's execution by Singapore for drug trafficking, as well as Japan's execution of three murderers the previous year. Bailes stated that the claims of the death penalty as an effective deterrent was greatly contradicted by the experience of many other countries, and he stated that hanging a mere drug mule like Nagaenthran would not be able to achieve the ends of justice since the mastermind and drug lord who hired Nagaenthran to deliver the drugs was not brought to justice. Bailes also stated in his own words, "Witnesses, juries and courts make mistakes, but the death penalty once carried out is irreversible." The case of Nagaenthran also brought to attention the past cases of Australians executed for drug offences in Southeast Asian countries (e.g. Barlow and Chambers execution in Malaysia, Van Tuong Nguyen in Singapore, and both Andrew Chan and Myuran Sukumaran of Bali Nine in Indonesia) and Australia's public opposition against the death penalty.

The case of Nagaenthran's execution brought attention to the cases of the nine remaining Malaysians (including Datchinamurthy Kataiah and Pannir Selvam Pranthaman) on Singapore's death row, as well as four other Malaysians hanged for drug trafficking prior to Nagaenthran's execution. The risk of execution of these nine Malaysians despite being alleged couriers or allegedly disabled brought concern to the activists who opposed the death penalty. The United Nations also criticised Singapore for executing Nagaenthran and Abdul Kahar Othman and stated that Singapore should impose a moratorium as a first step to abolish the death penalty, and urged Singapore to not execute Datchinamurthy Kataiah, who was the third drug trafficker facing imminent execution in Singapore.

=== Government's response ===
On the same day Nagaenthran was executed, the Attorney-General's Chambers (AGC) made an official statement, in which they strongly condemned the allegations and rumours spread in relation to Nagaenthran's case, especially those seeking to "cast aspersions" on the involvement of Chief Justice Sundaresh Menon, in which these rumours falsely suggested any form of bias made by Menon in his judgement in Nagaenthran's appeal. The AGC commented that the lawsuit against Menon was the seventh legal application (not including appeals) made on behalf of Nagaenthran, and they described the lawsuit as "the latest attempt to abuse the court's processes and unjustifiably delay the carrying into effect of the lawful sentence imposed on Nagaenthran."

The AGC also mentioned that prior to the lawsuit, it was specifically mentioned to Nagaenthran's counsel about Chief Justice Menon's appointment as the Attorney General during the prosecution of Nagaenthran, and Nagaenthran himself, under his lawyer's advice, made no objections for Menon to preside the lawsuit. However, this information appeared to be "deliberately" withheld from Nagaenthran's mother when she brought forward the lawsuit, since Nagaenthran's mother had filed the application with the help of friends and activists, the organisations of legal papers clearly were not solely the work of Nagaenthran's mother, and both the signature and email address did not belong to Nagaenthran's mother. Therefore, for these above reasons, there was no basis at all in making the application. The AGC responded in the official statement that these allegations amounted to "contempt of the court", and reiterated that it "takes a serious view of any act that may constitute contempt, and will not hesitate to take appropriate action to protect the administration of justice".

On 28 April 2022, the day after Nagaenthran's execution, both the AGC and the Central Narcotics Bureau (CNB) made statements to defend Singapore's decision to hang Nagaenthran in light of the international condemnation of Singapore and the execution. The AGC reiterated in a statement that Nagaenthran was given a fair trial and had "exhausted his rights of appeal and almost every other recourse under the law over some 11 years", while the CNB said in a separate statement that Nagaenthran's actions when committing the crime was "a deliberate, purposeful and calculated decision" and cited the related court findings, in which the judges all agreed that "he knew what he was doing" at the time of the offence.

The CNB also said that there were too much misinformation spread about Nagaenthran's mental state, and they reiterated that Nagaenthran was not intellectually disabled at the time of his offence since he had tried to evade the authorities and also narrated too many inconsistent accounts of how and what led to him committing the offences. The government's stand received support from many who discussed the case.

On 29 April 2022, it was revealed that three days before Nagaenthran's execution, Prime Minister Lee Hsien Loong and Minister for Foreign Affairs Vivian Balakrishnan had both responded to their Malaysian counterparts that Nagaenthran was accorded full due process under the law when they received the government's letter to review Nagaenthran's case and sentence. Malaysia's foreign minister Saifuddin Abdullah replied to the Singapore government in a statement that they acknowledged Nagaenthran's execution and this issue would not affect the diplomatic ties between Malaysia and Singapore, as they uphold their respect for the sovereignty rights of Singapore to decide on its own judicial system and laws.

In response to the United Nations' criticism of Singapore, Ambassador Umej Bhatia defended the government's decisions to execute Nagaenthran and Abdul Kahar Othman, as well as their use of the death penalty on drugs. Bhatia stated that all criminal proceedings in Singapore were conducted with due process before an "impartial and independent judiciary", and the death penalty would be passed on any suspect if their guilt were proven according to the law. He drew attention to Singapore's decades-long reputation for having a fair and impartial criminal justice system, and an independent and effective judiciary. Bhatia rebutted that there was no racial discrimination in response to the allegations of racial bias over the large number of minorities on Singapore's death row, and he cited that all individuals were subjected to equal and fair treatment under the laws of Singapore and were not given different treatment based on race or nationality. Bhatia reiterated that there was no need to impose a moratorium since there was no international consensus against the use of the death penalty "when it is imposed according to the due process of law", and added there was "no explicit definition" under international law or international consensus on what constitutes the "most serious crimes". Bhatia ended off his statement by citing that every country has its sovereign right to determine its own criminal justice system, considering its own circumstances and in accordance with its international law obligations.

With regards to Nagaenthran's case and the abuse of court processes made by Nagaenthran's lawyers, Minister of State for Home Affairs Muhammad Faishal Ibrahim stated that they accepted there were bound to be some liberal citizens harbouring passionate views towards capital punishment but he reiterated that there should be basic respect given to the law and it was unacceptable for individuals to repeatedly launch appeals in an concluded capital case without tangible evidence. Faishal also stated that legislative changes would be made and passed to impose penalties for any abuse of court processes. Furthermore, he highlighted the negative effects of drug abuse, noting that it can ruin not only the lives of drug users and their loved ones but also lead to crimes committed by individuals under the influence of drugs. He cited recent incidents, such as the sword attack in Buangkok Crescent in March 2022, the Queenstown knife attack involving two victims, and the fatal police shooting of a knife-wielding fugitive drug abuser, as examples to support his argument. He affirmed that the war on drugs would continue in Singapore, despite the growing liberal attitudes towards drug use among some young people.

==== HARDtalk interview ====
During a June 2022 BBC HARDtalk interview, Shanmugam, who was asked by the host and journalist Stephen Sackur regarding the death penalty, stated that the death penalty in Singapore was the right punishment adopted by the government to protect Singaporeans and save lives. He also cited a 2021 report by the World Health Organization (WHO) that showed there were 500,000 deaths linked to drug abuse in just one year. Shanmugam added that in the 1990s, Singapore was arresting about 6,000 people a year for drugs, but this has now dropped to about 3,000 people a year.

He stated that it goes to show that the laws deployed by Singapore on drug trafficking had safeguarded the lives of many locals and maintains a safe society in Singapore. Turning to Sackur's question about the morals behind the execution of Nagaenthran despite his alleged disability, Shanmugam rebutted that the courts found Nagaenthran was not intellectually disabled – which was confirmed by the psychiatrists called by his lawyers – and had made a calculated and calibrated decision to bring the drugs into Singapore. He also cited two cases of executed Americans with similar IQs like Nagaenthran to show there was no difference between Nagaenthran and the two men.

Stating that Sackur should not focus on the execution of one trafficker but on the bigger picture of Southeast Asia's severe drug situation (which caused countless fatalities among drug abusers in the region), Shanmugam quoted:

"To misquote a well-known quote, a single hanging of a drug trafficker is a tragedy; a million deaths from drug abuse is a statistic. That's what this shows."

The death penalty response by Shanmugam during the BBC interview was well-received and supported by many members of the public on social media.

=== Other responses ===
The opposition parties in Singapore – Reform Party, People's Power Party and Red Dot United – went on to write to Law Minister K Shanmugam, due to their concerns about the allegations of a climate of fear among lawyers, in the face of possible government reprisal, being discouraged from representing drug traffickers on death row, following the cases of Nagaenthran (through his mother's application) and Datchinamurthy where both had to be present without legal counsel. The three opposition parties wrote that these claims were serious allegations as everyone is equally entitled to the right to legal representation under Singapore law, and they hoped that the government could undertake measures to quell these allegations for fear it may cause damage to Singapore's reputation.

In a May 2022 litigation conference, Chief Justice Sundaresh Menon cited the increasing trend of multiple baseless legal applications made by many inmates against the death penalty, especially Nagaenthran's case where he expressed his concern about the blatant abuse of court processes. He called on to all lawyers in Singapore to not engage in such procedures, as regardless of the lawyers' duty to the client or other reasons, the courts cannot countenance such clear abuse of process as it breached the responsibility of legal officers to the court.

=== Legal proceedings against Nagaenthran's former counsel ===
On 10 May 2022, it was reported that Violet Netto, the lawyer who represented Nagaenthran in his second-last appeal to the Court of Appeal, was arrested and investigated for acting as a lawyer and solicitor without a valid practising certificate on at least three occasions, including Nagaenthran's case and the last-ditch appeals of another two death row inmates Pausi Jefridin and Roslan Bakar. It was decreed under the law that solicitors must apply for a practising certificate for every practice year they act in the capacity of an advocate and solicitor, and Netto's certificate was expired at the time she represented Nagaenthran. For this, she potentially faced the maximum sentence of six months' jail, a S$2,500 fine, or both if convicted of acting as a lawyer without a valid certificate.

Not only that, M Ravi was subjected to seven separate professional disciplinary inquiries which may result in him being fined, suspended or struck off the Bar as a lawyer, in addition to three contempt proceedings as well as a number of police investigations for the repeated abuse of court processes through Nagaenthran's case. Ravi was also given a travel ban which restricted him from going to Malaysia. Due to these above proceedings against Nagaenthran's former lawyers, the rights groups and Malaysian lawyers criticised Singapore for supposed harassment of lawyers and stated that Singapore should respect the criminals' rights to legal representation, since Nagaenthran's mother and another prisoner Datchinamurthy Kataiah find themselves, in two separate cases, without the representation of legal counsel to argue their cases.

On 25 May 2022, the Court of Appeal released a court order, in which they ruled that Ravi and Netto should pay over S$20,000 in costs to the Attorney-General's Chambers (AGC) as compensation to the unnecessary costs incurred by the lawsuits both lawyers made without solid evidence in Nagaenthran's case; Ravi was to bear 75% of the total cost while the remaining 25% would be covered by Netto. A small-scale public funding event was carried out to gather funds to help Ravi and Netto to discharge their fine; some activists criticised Singapore for punishing the two lawyers for merely fulfilling their duties for their former client. Also, Ravi, who also need to pay S$10,000 and S$12,000 for another two lawsuits separately, remained defiant and unapologetic, stating that he paid a heavy price in saving lives from capital punishment despite the government's condemnation of his errors.

=== Police probe of activists ===
On 27 June 2022, it was reported that several people including activists Kirsten Han and Rocky Howe were investigated by police for illegally organising three public assemblies outside Changi Prison without a police permit to show their opposition to the death penalty and support for drug traffickers Abdul Kahar Othman and Nagaenthran before their executions on 30 March 2022 and 27 April 2022 respectively. Han and Howe were also asked by police to submit their anti-death penalty slogan shirts, handphones and other possessions as evidence for upcoming police investigations.

=== Passing of the Post-Appeal Applications in Capital Cases Bill ===
In the aftermath of Nagaenthran's execution, in light of the increasing rate of abuses of court processes evidently caused by Nagaenthran's case and the subsequent other capital drug cases (all of which having exhausted the appeals and clemency process), the government of Singapore decided to pass a new law to impose stringent regulations on the filing of post-appeal applications, where only the Court of Appeal, the highest court of Singapore, could grant a stay of execution for a prisoner awaiting capital punishment in Singapore, as well as hearing the post-appeal applications. If a prisoner is found to have abused court processes, he will be prohibited from making a post-appeal application unless there is new evidence. A single judge would be appointed to hear the cases before deciding whether to postpone the inmate's execution and approve his post-appeal application, before the usual panel of three or five judges would be set to hear the application in the Court of Appeal. The Post-Appeal Applications in Capital Cases Bill was first drafted and passed on 29 November 2022. While this law was supported by most like Leader of Opposition Pritam Singh, there were criticisms from Human Rights Watch that Singapore did so to cut off inmates' chances to oppose their execution and access to last chances of justice.

== See also ==
- Capital punishment in Singapore
- Gobi Avedian
- List of major crimes in Singapore
- Misuse of Drugs Act (Singapore)
- Capital punishment by country
