= See Kee Oon =

Singaporean judge

The Honourable Justice See Kee Oon
- 施奇恩

Judge of the Court of Appeal of Singapore
- Incumbent
- Assumed office 1 October 2023

Judge of the High Court of Singapore
- Incumbent
- Assumed office 1 February 2017

Judicial Commissioner of the Supreme Court of Singapore
- Incumbent
- Assumed office 14 April 2014

Presiding Judge of the State Courts of Singapore
- In office 14 April 2014 – 31 March 2020
- Preceded by: Position Created
- Succeeded by: Vincent Hoong Seng Lei

Chief District Judge of the Subordinate Courts of Singapore
- In office 1 October 2013 – 13 April 2014
- Preceded by: Tan Siong Thye
- Succeeded by: Position Abolished

Personal details
- Born: 1966 (age 59–60) Singapore
- Education: National University of Singapore; Hughes Hall, Cambridge

See Kee Oon
- Simplified Chinese: 施奇恩
Transcriptions
Standard Mandarin
- Hanyu Pinyin: Shī Qí Ēn

See Kee Oon (born 1966) is a Singaporean judge who is currently a Judge of the Appellate Division of the Supreme Court.

== Education ==
See received a Bachelor of Laws from the National University of Singapore (NUS) in 1991 and obtained a Master of Laws (first class honours) from the University of Cambridge in 1994. He also holds a Master of Public Management from the NUS's Lee Kuan Yew School of Public Policy.

== Career ==
See joined the Singapore Legal Service in 1991 and was appointed as a Deputy Registrar and Magistrate in the Subordinate Courts (now State Courts). From 1995 to 1997, he served as a Justices' Law Clerk before becoming a District Judge in 1998. As a District Judge, he heard a variety of cases in the criminal, civil and family courts until 2007, when he became Head of the Insolvency and Public Trustee's Office. In November 2009, See was reappointed as a District Judge and subsequently made Senior District Judge, heading the Criminal Justice Division of the Subordinate Courts.

During his tenure as District Judge, See presided over the robbery trial of Ragu Ramajayam, who was the secondary mastermind of a S$1.3 million mobile phone heist, during which Ragu's colleague Wan Cheon Kem was robbed and brutally killed by Ragu's accomplices. See sentenced 37-year-old Ragu to six years in prison and 12 strokes of the cane, after taking into account that Ragu breached his position of trust and his role in the heist itself had led to the murder of Wan. Ragu's sentence was later reduced to 4 1/2 years in jail and six strokes of the cane after he appealed. In the aftermath, one of Ragu's accomplices, Nakamuthu Balakrishnan, was given the death sentence for murder while the remaining three were given jail terms and caning for armed robbery with hurt.

In June 2010, See sentenced Swiss national Oliver Fricker to five months in prison (three for vandalism and two for trespassing) and three strokes of the cane (for vandalism). See said of Fricker's actions, "he was fully conscious of the criminal nature of the act and must be prepared to face the consequences", and agreed with the prosecutor that the defendant had committed a very serious offence that had "alarmed the general public" and "shaken their confidence in the security of protected places".

On 1 October 2013, See became the Chief District Judge of the Subordinate Courts. During this time, he also served as a member of a committee to guide the development of the Singapore University of Social Sciences's School of Law. On 14 April 2014, he was appointed as a Judicial Commissioner and Presiding Judge of the State Courts. On 31 January 2017, he was promoted to Judge of the Supreme Court. He was subsequently appointed as a Judge of the Appellate Division in October 2023.

One case presided over by See was the 2021 trial of Gaiyathiri Murugayan, who was charged with the abuse and murder of Piang Ngaih Don, a Myanmar national who was her domestic maid. Gaiyathiri was found guilty of culpable homicide not amounting to murder and voluntarily causing hurt to the maid, and sentenced to a total of 30 years' imprisonment. See described the case as one of the worst cases of culpable homicide Singapore had ever seen, and said that the degree of callousness and violence was so shocking that no suitable words could adequately describe the inhumane year-long mistreatment, assault and starvation, which the maid was subjected to.

In July 2018, See was also the presiding judge of a female drug trafficker's case for diamorphine trafficking. The female trafficker, Saridewi Djamani, was charged with one count of smuggling 30.72g of diamorphine; she put up a defense that she only meant to traffic less than half of the drugs while leaving the remaining majority portion for her personal use during the Muslim fasting month Ramadan. See rejected Saridewi's claims, since she had attempted to downplay the scale of her criminal activities and they were inconsistent with her evidence regarding her daily drug intake in both her police statements and court testimony. Since Saridewi was not acting as a courier, she was sentenced to death upon her conviction for diamorphine trafficking. Saridewi's Malaysian accomplice Muhammad Haikal Abdullah was jointly tried and later sentenced to life imprisonment and caning (15 strokes) by See on the same day of Saridewi's sentencing since he was acting as a courier and provided full cooperation with the authorities during investigations. Five years later, 45-year-old Saridewi was executed on 28 July 2023, becoming the first female offender to be put to death, 19 years after the Yen May Woen case in 2004.

See was also the judge who heard the last-minute appeals by two Malaysian drug traffickers Pannir Selvam Pranthaman and Nagaenthran K. Dharmalingam in 2020 and 2021 respectively, as they sought to reopen their cases and delay their executions. Both Pannir and Nagaenthran lost their appeals and remained on death row. Nagaenthran was initially to be executed on 10 November 2021, but the execution was delayed when he tested positive for COVID-19. Nagaenthran was hanged on 27 April 2022.

In May 2023, See sentenced an 86-year-old Singaporean man to 15 years in jail for the "deliberately and unspeakably vicious and brutal" killing of his 79-year-old live-in partner Lim Soi Moy, with whom the man had four children. The convicted killer, Pak Kian Huat, had hacked Lim to death with a chopper after he was angered by Lim's refusal to let him sleep in a bigger bedroom at their flat in Toa Payoh in 2019, and he pleaded guilty after his original charge of murder was lowered to manslaughter. See, in sentencing Pak to the jail term proposed by the prosecution, admonished Pak for his lack of remorse and the brutality of his attack on Lim over a trivial matter of perceived grievances, and he also stated that the advanced age of Pak did not count as a factor to shorten his sentence in view of the heinous act, which would have attracted life imprisonment.
