= Buntong =

Suburb of Ipoh, Perak, Malaysia

Coordinates: 4°35′39.3″N 101°04′07.3″E

Buntong (Jawi: بونتوڠ; Chinese: 文冬, Tamil: புந்தோங்) is a suburb of Ipoh, Perak, Malaysia. Buntong is one of the largest residential areas in the city of Ipoh. It is known for Kampung Kacang Puteh, a major industrial hub for producing Indian foods including sweets and murukku.

== Demographics ==
Ethnic composition of Buntong(2020)
Ethnicities / Nationality	Percentage
Indians	52%
Chinese	41%
Malay	6%
Others	1%

Buntong has the highest concentration of Indians in Malaysia. More than half of the population are made up of Indians, followed by Chinese. There are a small number of Malays living in Buntong.
