= Lee Seiu Kin =

Singaporean judge (born 1954)

- Born: 1954 (age 71–72); Singapore
- Occupation: Judge

Justice Lee Seiu Kin (Chinese: 李兆坚; pinyin: Lǐ Zhàojiān) is a Senior Judge of the Supreme Court of Singapore.

== Early life and education ==
Born in Malaysia in 1954, Lee was educated in Malaysia and Singapore. He then studied engineering at the University of Adelaide, graduating with an honours degree in 1977 and worked as a civil engineer for a few years, before obtaining a Masters of Science (Construction Engineering) from the National University of Singapore in 1982. He obtained an MBA(Distinction) from INSEAD, at Fontainebleau, France in 1983. He then studied law at the National University of Singapore, graduating in 1986 with an LLB(Hons). He subsequently obtained a Masters of Law from the University of Cambridge in 1987.

== Career ==
Upon graduating from law school, Lee served in various capacities in the Attorney-General's Chambers before he was first appointed as Judicial Commissioner of the Supreme Court of Singapore on 15 October 1997. He subsequently returned to the Attorney-General's Chambers as Second Solicitor-General, before returning to the Supreme Court of Singapore as a Judge in 2006.

On 31 January 2024, President Tharman Shanmugaratnam appointed Lee as Senior Judge of the Supreme Court. Lee is presently a Resident in The Arbitration Chambers where he practises as an arbitrator and mediator.
