= Woodlands Checkpoint =

Immigration complex in Woodlands, Singapore

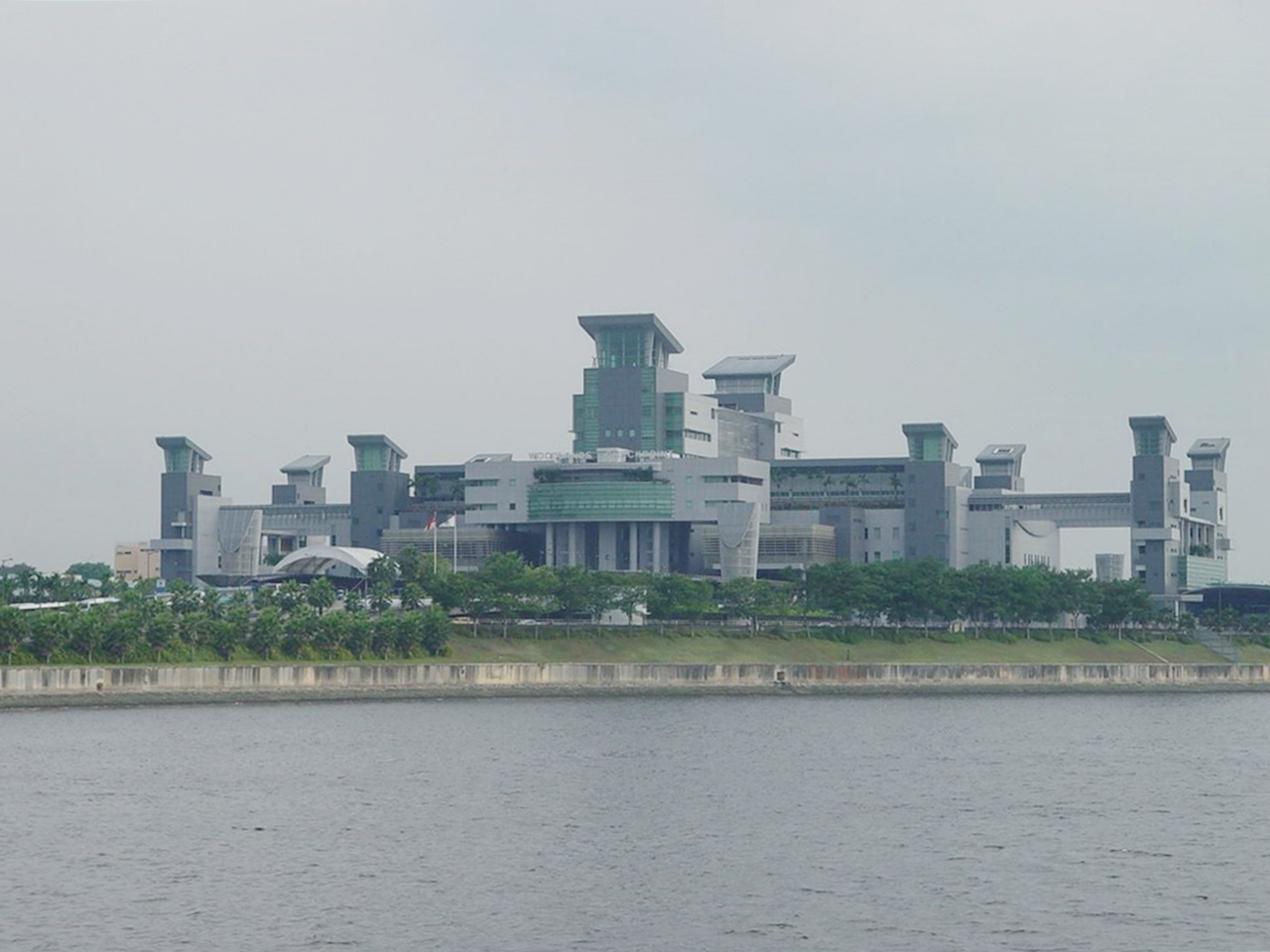
- Woodlands Checkpoint in 2003

General information
- Type: Immigration and customs complex
- Location: Woodlands, Singapore
- Owner: Immigration and Checkpoints Authority

Design and construction
- Architect: PWD Consultants Pte Ltd

The Woodlands Checkpoint is one of Singapore's two land border checkpoints, connecting ground traffic with Malaysia. It services the vehicular traffic (cars, buses, lorries, motorcycles) along with pedestrians that goes through the Johor–Singapore Causeway. The only other Singapore land border checkpoint (Tuas Checkpoint) services the Malaysia–Singapore Second Link.

== Overview ==
=== Current checkpoint (since 1999) ===
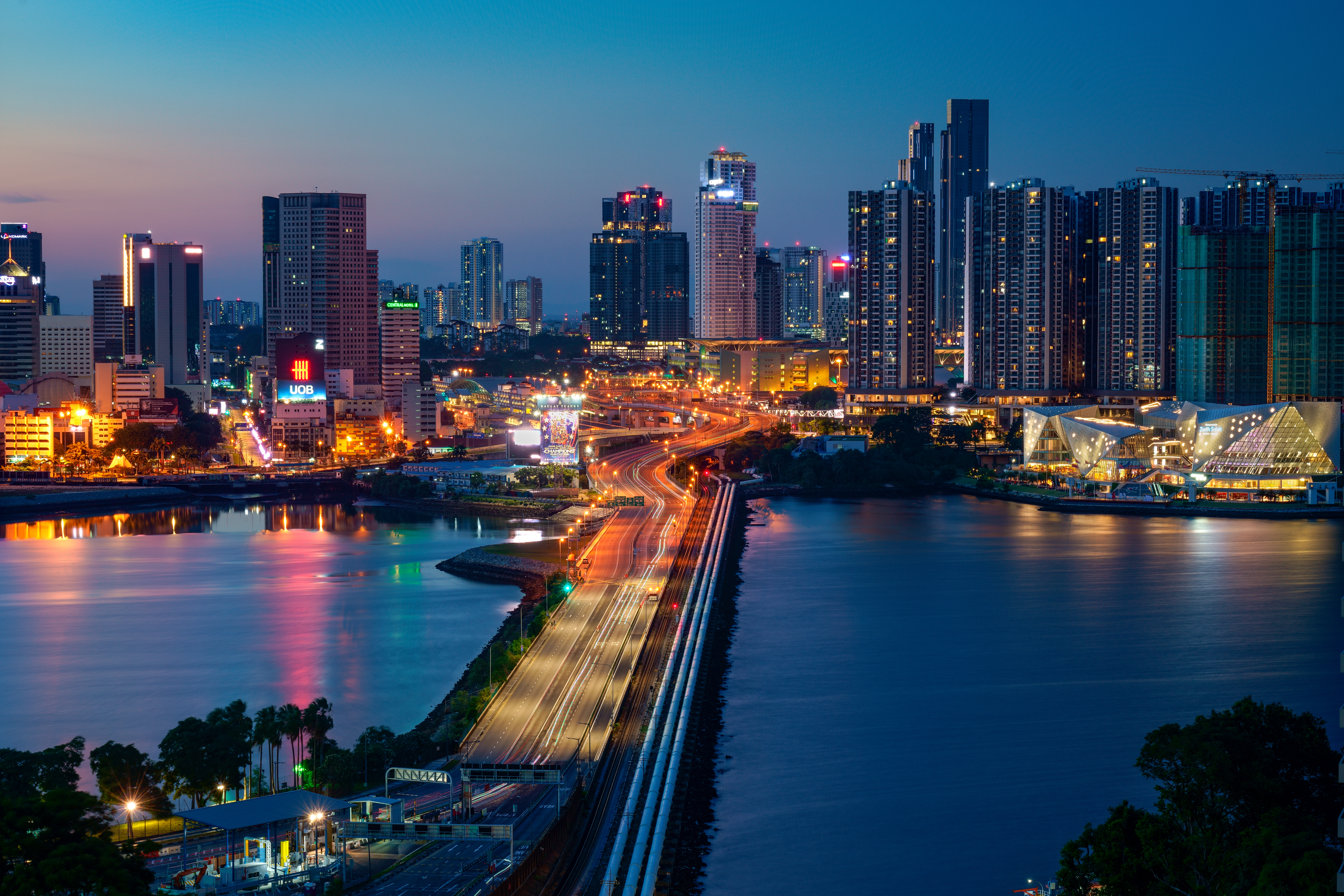
Johor–Singapore Causeway

Whilst the current checkpoint was being renovated to deal with the increasing traffic flow in the short term, plans were mooted to redevelop the 1977 checkpoint in 1989. These plans took nearly a decade to be realized. To aid the redevelopment, an additional S$34 million (1989) (US$17.43 million) 8.3 ha of land was to be reclaimed from the waters next to the checkpoint, and this was undertaken by the Housing and Development Board. While the redevelopment at Woodlands was ongoing, the opening of the Malaysia–Singapore Second Link provided some respite to the traffic congestion at the Johor-Singapore causeway.

The new Woodlands Checkpoint, built partially on reclaimed land, was opened in 1999 to accommodate the increasing traffic flow and the soot which had enveloped the old customs complex over the years. The old customs complex, built in the early 1970s, located at the junction between Woodlands Road and Woodlands Centre Road closed after the new checkpoint was opened on 18 July 1999, although the motorcycle lane remained open in the mornings until 2001, and it was reopened on 1 March 2008 for goods vehicles only.

The new checkpoint complex is attached to the adjacent Woodlands Train Checkpoint, opened on 1 August 1998, as the Singapore railway border clearance facility, which was previously co-located with Malaysian immigration and customs at Tanjong Pagar railway station. The relocation to Woodlands caused disputes between the two countries, which was resolved in 2010. On 1 July 2011, Woodlands Train Checkpoint replaced Tanjong Pagar railway station as Singapore's inter-city railway station. Northbound rail passengers pass through co-located border clearance for both countries at Woodlands Train Checkpoint before boarding the train to Malaysia. Southbound rail passengers clear Malaysian exit controls at JB Sentral, and Singapore immigration and customs on arrival at Woodlands Train Checkpoint.

With regards to road public transport, Woodlands Checkpoint has frequent cross-border bus services linking Bangunan Sultan Iskandar (JB CIQ) in Johor Bahru to northern rapid transit stops such as Kranji MRT station, Marsiling MRT station and Woodlands MRT station (through SBS Transit and SMRT Buses), along with Queen Street (Bugis MRT station) and Newton Circus (Newton MRT station) in downtown Singapore (through Causeway Link). In addition, Woodlands Checkpoint is regularly accessed by commuters walking along a pedestrian footbridge to and from the adjacent Woodlands Train Checkpoint, which has regular and frequent domestic bus and taxi services; the Woodlands Train Checkpoint features a domestic bus stop, a domestic taxi stand and a domestic ride-hail (private hire cars) stand.

== History ==
=== Background ===
Even after the completion of the Johor–Singapore Causeway in 1924 connecting the Singapore island and the peninsula, there was no formal land border checkpoint in Singapore restricting the flow of people between the two lands, until Singapore's independence from Malaysia in 1965. This was due to the fact that Singapore and the rest of Peninsular Malaysia had either been under a single sovereign control (in the form of the British colonial administration, Straits Settlements, Malayan Union and Japanese occupation during World War II in Asia) or enjoined in a single political entity (Federation of Malaysia). During these periods of singular external control, the security of Singapore's side of the Causeway had been nominally managed by the local police authorities. The police would step up its security checks when the situation demanded it, like during the Malayan Emergency or dealing with the aftermath of prison breaks at the prison at Pearl's Hill. Generally people at both sides of the causeway could travel between Singapore and Johor, ergo Peninsular Malaysia freely. Since the independence of Singapore, there have been several physical replacements of the Woodlands Checkpoint complex to accommodate the growing traffic between the two countries, but they have largely located within the same area.

=== 1966 checkpoint ===
The independence of Singapore from Malaysia on 9 August 1965 necessitated a customs and immigration checkpoint at Singapore's end of the causeway. The process of establishing diplomatic recognitions between Singapore and Indonesia had left Malaysian politicians feeling uneasy. The era of the joint travel visa enjoyed by both Malaysians and Singaporeans would come to an end, and eventually instead of using identity cards for identification purposes, both citizenries would have to use travel documents such as passports to enter either country. Due to new immigration laws, a checkpoint was established at Woodlands to check on all foreigners, except those who held Malaysian identity cards or having special visa arrangements entering Singapore effective 2 August 1966.

=== 1967 checkpoint ===
To fulfil an earlier requirement by the Malaysian government that all travellers between the two nations had to use travel documents by 1 July 1967, the construction for a customs and immigration checkpoint for the causeway was completed and operationalised in time for the 1 July 1967 deadline. However, due to a delay in implementing the new requirement by Malaysia, Singaporeans could travel to Malaysia using their identity cards until 1 September 1967. Completed at a cost of S$270,000 (1967) (US$88,200), the double-storey checkpoint would replace the 1966 checkpoint located next to it. There were six traffic lanes for incoming traffic and three lanes for outgoing traffic. Services provided at the checkpoint included issuance of Restricted passports.

=== 1977 checkpoint ===
By 1972, there was a daily average of 18,000 vehicles travelling through the causeway. This led the Public Works Department to widen the causeway from 30 feet to 83 feet. Costing at S$1.2 million (1974) (US$492,435.64), a railway bridge would be constructed as well. The projects were completed in 1976. The 1967 checkpoint would also be replaced with an expanded version about 40 metres south of it to process up to a projected 40,000 passengers a day in 1982. The expanded version would cost S$12 million (1977) (US$4.92 million). The new checkpoint would also host five dog kennels which would house narcotics-sniffing dogs, which would detect more than half of the drugs trafficked through the checkpoint in 1978. The checkpoint was opened in two phases, in May 1977 and January 1978. The opening of the checkpoint also signalled the implementation of the Exit Control Scheme, which was to prevent visitors to the nation from overstaying. It was not implemented earlier as the 1967 checkpoint was already operating at its fullest capabilities. This checkpoint was declared to be able to cope with the traffic for the next ten years as well.

The new checkpoint also saw the introduction of computers with varying levels of success. The initial computers installed by the Registry of Vehicles to check the validity of the vehicles were subject to dusty conditions and were prone to frequent breakdowns. Additional computers were installed and used in 1981, speeding up the process with greater accuracy to check for people on the immigration blacklists, allowing officers to detect 470 people, up from 35 monthly.

By 1987, it was becoming more apparent that the causeway was becoming jammed with increasing frequency. Short term works, costing S$13 million (1989) (US$6.67 million), were done on the current checkpoint buildings and fixtures to increase the efficiency of the immigration officiers. Better designed checking booths were introduced in 1986. Existing halls were expanded, with additional clearance lanes being built in 1989. However, such short-term works were projected to help cope with the increasing volume of traffic only into the mid-1990s.

== Future extension ==
On 30 March 2017, authorities announced that the Old Woodlands Town Centre (OWTC) and two privately owned blocks were compulsorily acquired by the government, in order for the land to be converted into an extension of the 1999 checkpoint. The tenants and owners at OWTC and the privately owned blocks were compensated at market value, and OWTC was closed on 30 November 2017. On 26 May 2022, authorities announced that they would acquire 9 blocks of Housing and Development Board flats for the same extension.

== Connectivity ==
The Bukit Timah Expressway (BKE) links Woodlands Checkpoint with the rest of the expressway network in Singapore.

=== Cross Border Bus Services ===
The cross-border land transportation of the Woodlands Checkpoint towards Johor Bahru, via the Johor–Singapore Causeway, is mainly served by eight cross-border public bus services, as well as four private-owned cross-border express coach services. Singapore government-owned public bus services 160, 170 and 170X are part of Bukit Merah Bus Package, and service 950 is part of the Woodlands Bus Package, both under the Land Transport Authority's Bus Contracting Model. Malaysian mobility company Causeway Link owns and operates the public bus services CW1, CW2 and CW5. Singapore mobility company Advanced Coach Services owns and operates the public service AC7. Private express bus services starting from Queen Street, as well as Changi Airport and Resorts World Sentosa, are operated by Singapore-Johore Express (SJE) Pte Ltd and Transtar Travel & Tours Pte Ltd (Only TS1 and TS8 is operating).

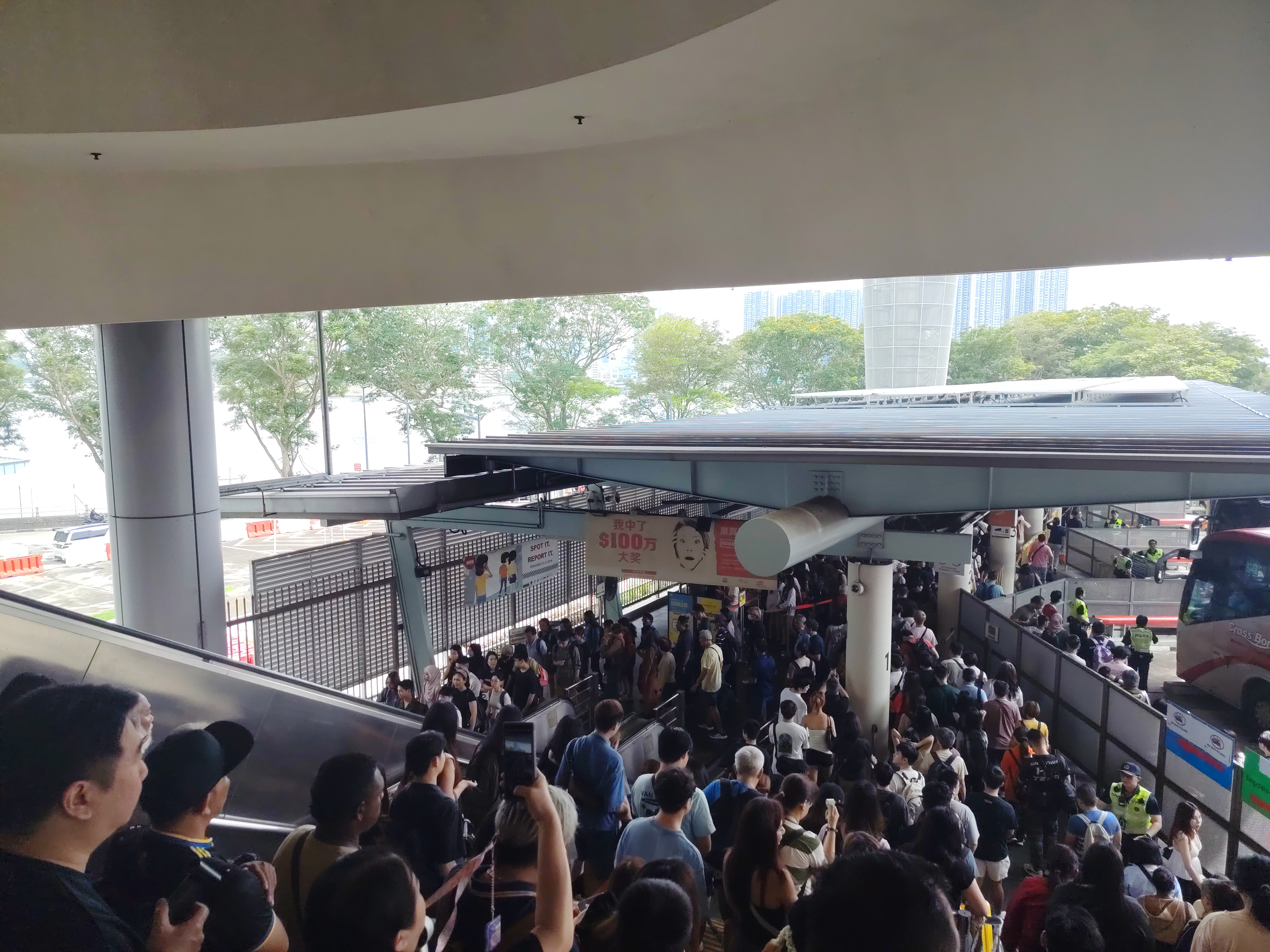
View from the staircase leading to the departure bus bay of Woodlands Checkpoint towards Bangunan Sultan Iskandar, the Malaysian land checkpoint across the Johor–Singapore Causeway, foreshadowing the massive volume of daily crowd crossing the land route.

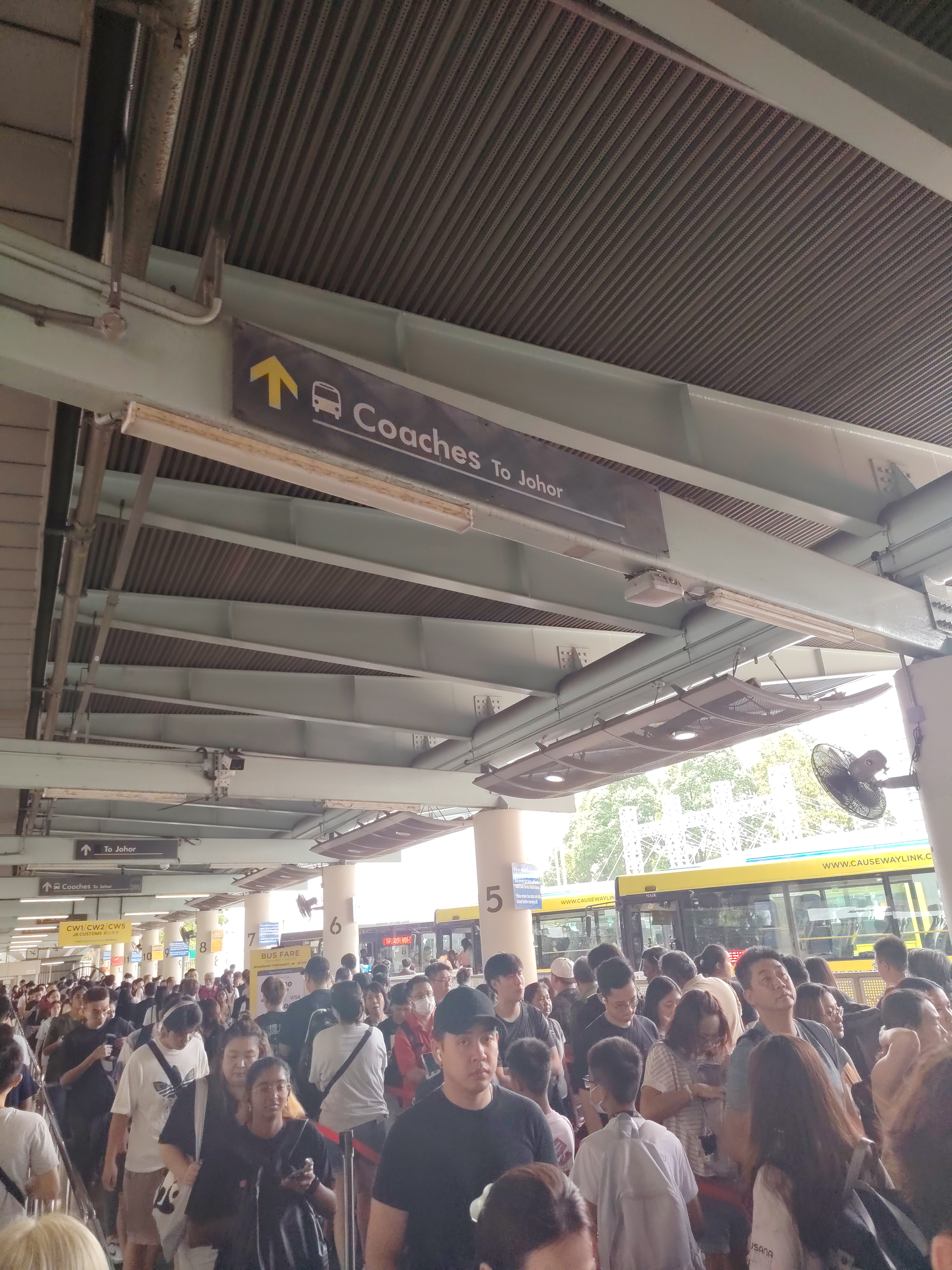
View from the queue for Causeway Link cross-border bus service towards towards Bangunan Sultan Iskandar, at the departure bus bays of Woodlands Checkpoint. Image taken in May 2026

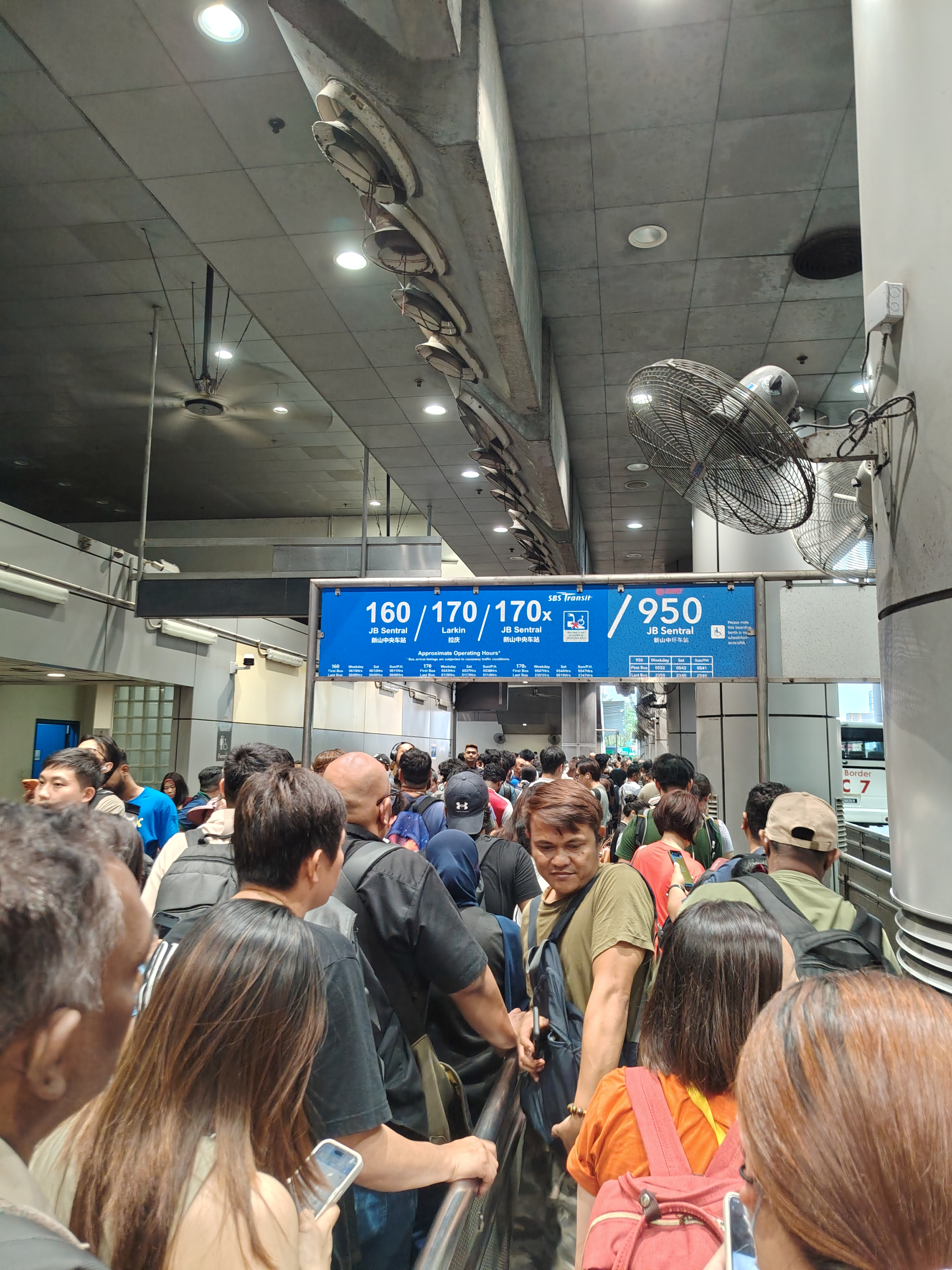
Combined boarding berth queues for Singapore public bus (SGBus) services 160, 170(x) and 950, at the departure boarding bay of Woodlands Checkpoint. Photograph taken on a weekend evening in July 2026.

Cross-Border Public & Express Bus Services to Sultan Iskandar Building (JB CIQ)
Cross-Border Bus Service	Payment Methods					
Cross-Border Bus Service	Cash	Ez-Link	ManjaLink	Contactless Bank Card (Visa)	Contactless Bank Card (MasterCard)	Contactless Bank Card (AMEX)
SG Bus: SBS Transit SMRT Buses (160 / 170 / 170X / 950)	Yes; Flat fee	Yes; Distance-based fares, tap on entry and exit.^{1 4}	No	Yes; Distance-based fares, tap on entry and exit.^{1 4}: Only for use with a single individual per card on same payment medium. ^{2}		
SG Bus: SBS Transit SMRT Buses (160 / 170 / 170X / 950)	Notes:^{1} Maximum possible fare of the bus service from the point of entry will be charged if card is not tapped upon exit.^{2} Physical contactless bank card, and the same bank-card added to a mobile wallet (Apple Pay, Google Pay, Samsung Pay, Fitbit Pay, and Garmin Pay) are considered separate payment media, and can be used by separate individuals.^{3} To avoid additional charges, the same card of the same payment media (physical card or mobile wallet) must be used to tap in and out. Failure to do so would result in full fares being separately charged: from the boarding point to the final stop on the first card, and from the first stop to the alighting point on the second.^{4} A Foreign Bank Card Admin Fee of $0.60 will be Accepted per day of use for fare payment with non-Singapore-issued MasterCard or Visa contactless bank cards.^{5} "Ride Suspended" will be shown when tapping out at JB CIQ or Woodlands Checkpoint to allow continuation of the trip on the same bus service after immigration clearance if it is on Card-Based Ticketing (CBT). If the trip is not continued on a Singapore public bus, a distance-based fare will be charged for the journey ending at the checkpoint.					
Causeway Link (CW1 / CW2 / CW5)	Yes; Flat fee	Yes; Flat fee NETS FlashPay cards are not accepted.	Yes; Flat fee			No
Singapore-Johore Express	Yes; Flat fee		No			
Advanced Coach Services (AC7)	Yes; Flat fee		No			
TransStar (TS1 / TS8)	Yes; Flat fee		No			
