= Vignes Mourthi =

Malaysian drug trafficker hanged in Singapore in 2003

- Born: Vignes s/o Mourthi; 21 March 1980; Perak, Malaysia
- Died: 26 September 2003 (aged 23); Changi Prison, Singapore
- Cause of death: Execution by hanging
- Parent: Vasu Mourthi (father)
- Status: Executed
- Conviction: Drug trafficking (one count)
- Criminal charges: Trafficking of 27.65g of diamorphine
- Penalty: Death penalty

Vignes s/o Mourthi (21 March 1980 – 26 September 2003) was a Malaysian convicted drug trafficker who was found guilty of trafficking 27.65 grams of diamorphine on 20 September 2001. After the end of his trial in August 2002, Vignes and his accomplice Moorthy a/l Angappan (also a Malaysian) were both sentenced to death since the death penalty was mandatory for the amount trafficked by the duo. Despite the immense evidence against him, Vignes maintained his innocence and appealed many times to overturn his conviction and sentence. Ultimately, Vignes was put to death alongside Moorthy as scheduled on 26 September 2003. His execution remained a controversy even in the aftermath due to his insistent claims of innocence.

== Biography ==
Vignes Mourthi was a Malaysian born in the Malaysian state of Perak on 21 March 1980. His father Vasu Mourthi made a living as a food seller. Vignes had three sisters in his family, and he was married in April 2001. He had no children.

Vignes and his kin moved to Johor Bahru in the late 1990s, and from that point, Vignes began travelling to Singapore to work, like many Malaysians before him who travelled to Singapore for better employment and higher income to provide better life. He was working as a machine operator prior to his arrest.

== Drug trafficking trial ==
On 20 September 2001, 21-year-old Vignes Mourthi was arrested for drug trafficking. According to the official version of events by the Central Narcotics Bureau (CNB) and court documents, after the CNB received a tip-off by an informant about one of the members of a drug syndicate seeking to sell diamorphine to buyers in Singapore. Vignes was approached by an undercover officer, Sergeant Rajkumar, who expressed his interest to buy a package of drugs and offered a payment of S$8,000. At the scheduled location outside a mosque in Admiralty, Vignes was arrested after he passed the package to Sergeant Rajkumar. After the interrogation of Vignes, it was uncovered that there was another accomplice named Moorthy Angappan, and a team of officers was sent to apprehend Moorthy outside a fruit shop at Woodlands. In the package, the police discovered diamorphine which weighed a total amount of 27.65g, which was nearly twice the amount which mandated the death sentence under the laws of Singapore. Both Vignes and Moorthy stood trial at the High Court the following year.

According to Vignes in his defence, although he did not deny delivering the package, he believed that the packages contained incense stones and insisted that he was doing Moorthy, his father's friend, a favour. Mourthi said that five days before the crime, he met Moorthy at his family home and accepted the offer to deliver a package of incense stones to a man called Tahir in Singapore after knowing that Moorthy dabbled in the transportation business. It happened that on the same day itself Vignes injured his leg due to a motorcycle accident outside the Woodlands Checkpoint, hence Moorthy gave him a ride. Mourthi also stated that he had never seen heroin before and realised that the packages contained drugs only after he was arrested. He denied telling the officers and interpreter in Tamil that the package contained "kallu" (meaning stone, which is the street name for diamorphine), but he insisted it contained "sambrani kallu", a type of Indian incense stone normally used in Indian temples.

Moorthy, who was married with two children and resided in Johor, told the court that he was not involved in the offence charged and only gave a ride to Vignes due to the latter's leg injury, as a repayment of Vignes's father's kindness to him back in 1998 when his then pregnant wife, mother and younger brother got into a car accident, and Vignes's father travelled from Perak to Seremban to ensure their welfare. Moorthy stated he was unfortunately implicated by Vignes in his statements due to Vignes not wanting to shoulder the rap alone and wanted another person to share the blame with him. He even claimed that he had an alibi and was at his sister's house celebrating his nephew's 7th birthday (which actually fell on 2 September) on the day he supposedly met Vignes and made the offer to Vignes to help deliver the drugs.

In August 2002, after the end of the trial, Judicial Commissioner Tay Yong Kwang, the trial judge, determined in his verdict (published full on 20 October 2002) that Vignes was aware that he was carrying diamorphine based on his resistance he put up prior to the arrest and other evidence against him and it could not be incense stones as he claimed he believed to be. The inconsistencies of Vignes's account with the officers' evidence also led to the judge accepting that there was no inaccuracy in recording his statements. As for Moorthy, his alibi defence was contradicted by the numerous witness accounts of Vignes's family members who witnessed Moorthy at their family home during his visit, and it was more likely for Moorthy's family members to give evidence that were in his advantage when they were called to support Moorthy's alibi. Also, it was credible that he indeed instigated Vignes to deliver the diamorphine. As such, Vignes Mourthi and Moorthy Angappan were both found guilty of drug trafficking and sentenced to death.

== Appeals of Moorthy and Vignes ==
Through his lawyers Subhas Anandan and Anand Nalachandran, Vignes filed an appeal against his conviction and sentence. He once again reiterated his claims of innocence and sought an acquittal. However, on 20 January 2003, the Court of Appeal's three judges - Chao Hick Tin, Judith Prakash and the Chief Justice Yong Pung How - agreed with the trial judge Tay Yong Kwang's findings that Vignes indeed knew that he carried diamorphine and was not truthful in his statements about delivering incense stones to Tahir. Hence, they rejected his appeal.

Similarly, Moorthy also filed an appeal under the representation of his lawyer Michael Chia, but his alibi defence was also rejected by the three judges who dismissed his appeal on the same day as Vignes.

Subsequently, Vignes petitioned for clemency from then President of Singapore S R Nathan, which would allow Vignes's sentence be commuted to life imprisonment if successful. Clemency was last granted in April 1998, when Mathavakannan Kalimuthu, one of the three gang members who killed a rival gangster during a fight, was pardoned from execution by then President Ong Teng Cheong and later served 16 years under a life sentence before his release in 2012 on parole. Mathavakannan's two accomplices were executed a month after Mathavakannan escaped the gallows.

However, in early September 2003, President Nathan rejected the 23-year-old Malaysian's death row plea for clemency, hereby finalizing Vignes's death sentence. While it was not known if Moorthy appealed for clemency, his sentence was also finalized as well.

== Death warrant and execution ==
Soon after the loss of his clemency appeal, Vignes's family received a death warrant signed by Superintendent Peck Tiang Hock. Inside the letter, it was informed that the execution of Vignes was scheduled to take place on 26 September 2003.

On 10 September 2003, Vasu Mourthi, Vignes's father who believed that his son was innocent, sought help from former Opposition leader J B Jeyaretnam to help overturn his son's conviction. Jeyaretnam, who agreed to Mourthi's request, thus engaged lawyer M Ravi to defend Vignes in his upcoming legal application for a stay of execution and a re-trial. According to Ravi, it was his first capital case after six years of law practice which led to him subsequently take up cases of prisoners facing the death penalty in Singapore (which included Yong Vui Kong, Cheong Chun Yin and Nagaenthran K. Dharmalingam) and the mark of his controversial career as a human rights lawyer.

The application was brought forward at the High Court before High judge Woo Bih Li. However, on 12 September 2003, the application was rejected after Justice Woo judged that the High Court had no jurisdiction whatsoever to intervene in a case where it was thoroughly scrutinized during both trial and appeal. Justice Woo also took to reprimand Ravi for his disrespect and lack of proper conduct when making his arguments and insulting the judge. Another re-trial request by Ravi was also rejected by Justice Lai Kew Chai on 20 September 2003. The misconduct by Ravi caused him to be reprimanded and fined in a disciplinary hearing as a result of Justice Woo's complaint to the Legal Society of Singapore.

The Court of Appeal subsequently heard Ravi's appeal on the eve of Vignes's execution. In the appeal, it was similarly raised before Justices Lai and Woo that the evidence to prove Vignes's supposed innocence was ignored and suppressed by Sergeant Rajkumar. Chief Justice Yong Pung How, however, stated that there was lack of merit in his appeal, since there was indeed no jurisdiction for the court to intervene in a case that had been tried and had its right to appeal exhausted, and there was already confirmation that Vignes was rightly convicted of the charge against him based on the evidence against him. In a sarcastic remark against Ravi (who remained defiant in court), CJ Yong harshly retorted, "You have to say goodbye to him, that's all you can do. He's going to be hanged anyhow." Due to the loss of his final appeal, Vignes was to be hanged at the same gallows as Moorthy, who similarly received his death warrant but did not appeal. The case was brought to the attention of local and international media due to the actions of Ravi and the legal saga brought forward by Vignes in his bid to evade the gallows, and human rights organisation Amnesty International also sought clemency for both Moorthy and Vignes from the Singapore government.

On 26 September 2003, both Vignes Mourthi and Moorthy Angappan were hanged at dawn in Changi Prison. Vignes was 23 years old at the time of his execution. Both Vignes and Moorthy were the 11th and 12th persons to be executed in Singapore in the year 2003. Vignes's family were allowed to retrieve his body and they conducted a funeral and cremation for Vignes. His parents, sisters and other relatives were reportedly filled with heartbreak over Vignes's death.

== Aftermath ==
Even after Vignes Mourthi's execution, his case remained controversial in the aftermath due to the allegations of his innocence despite the courts having correctly deemed him guilty of the drug offence he was charged for.

Vignes's former lawyer M Ravi wrote about the case in his book Hung At Dawn, which was published in 2005.

Alan Shadrake, a British journalist, wrote about Vignes's case in his book Once A Jolly Hangman: Singapore Justice in the Dock, which was first published in 2010. However, as the book contained severe inaccuracies and false allegations about Singapore's judicial system, Shadrake was apprehended for charges of contempt of court in July 2010 by the Singapore authorities upon entering Singapore for a planned promotion of his book, and later sentenced to a jail term of six weeks and a S$20,000 fine (or two weeks' jail by default). Shadrake, who did not show regret or repentance of his crime, later appealed the sentence but it was ultimately denied, and he was imprisoned until July 2011.

In Shadrake's book, it was revealed that the undercover officer, Sergeant Rajkumar, who was the prosecution's key witness and had helped arrest Vignes, happened to be under investigation for charges of sodomy, rape and bribery when he came to court as a witness. Two years after Vignes was hung, Sergeant Rajkumar was locked away in prison for fifteen months after being convicted of bribery. Shadrake wrote about the questionable conduct of Sergeant Rajkumar in his testimony during the trial, and cast numerous aspersions on the Singapore judiciary by falsely claiming that the judiciary turned a blind eye at Sergeant Rajkumar's misdeeds and purposely suppressed knowledge of them until after Vignes was executed. These unproven allegations, plus the other false claims that Singapore spared the rich and educated from the gallows while reserving it for the poor, uneducated and disabled, were the main reasons for the Court of Appeal to dismiss Shadrake's appeal. Oppostition party Singapore Democratic Party also harshly condemned and admonished Shadrake for his malicious portrayal and serious allegations of Singapore's judiciary.

Subsequently, due to Shadrake's coverage of Vignes's case and information of Sergeant Rajkumar's misconduct, the family of Vignes and some Malaysian lawyers mounted a protest, seeking a posthumous acquittal of Vignes, whom they maintained as innocent in spite of the evidence to prove Vignes's genuine guilt for the crime.

When the Malaysian lawyers and politicians were seeking to reduce 19-year-old Yong Vui Kong's death sentence in 2010, Malaysian human rights lawyer N Surendran highlighted that the shortcomings of the mandatory death penalty were that there was no discretion to select another sentence more appropriate than death and that if a person was executed, there was no chance of recourse for the defendant. Surendran cited Vignes's case as one of these possible cases due to the role of Sergeant Rajkumar who may have possibly exhibited a breach of professional conduct during his investigations of Vignes's case.

In 2016, Kirsten Han, an anti-death penalty activist, also wrote about Vignes's case, and cited that there was need to reform the procedure of investigations, due to the fact that an unsigned written note containing Vignes's admission to the officer that he carried diamorphine was admitted as one of the parts of evidence to prosecute Vignes. Han conceded that while there may be possible implications that played a role in Vignes's case due to Sergeant Rajkumar's legal troubles and character, the officers related to the drug cases she mentioned have acted according to their protocol.

== See also ==
- Capital punishment in Singapore
