= Cheong Chun Yin =

Convicted drug trafficker sentenced to life imprisonment in Singapore

- Police mugshot of Cheong Chun Yin in 2008
- Born: 7 September 1983 (age 43); Perak, Malaysia
- Occupation: Disc stall helper (former)
- Parent: Cheong Kah Pin (father)
- Status: Imprisoned at Changi Prison since 16 June 2008
- Conviction: Drug trafficking (one count)
- Criminal charge: Trafficking of 2.726kg of heroin
- Penalty: Death penalty, later commuted to life imprisonment and 15 strokes of the cane

Cheong Chun Yin (Chinese: 张俊炎; pinyin: Zhāng Jùnyán; born 7 September 1983) is a Malaysian former death row convict who is currently serving a life sentence in Singapore for drug trafficking. He and a female accomplice were both convicted of trafficking of 2,726g of heroin into Singapore from Myanmar in 2008, and sentenced to death by hanging in 2010. Cheong submitted multiple unsuccessful appeals against his sentence; his case, similar to Yong Vui Kong's, received much attention in the media, at a time when activists argued for Singapore to abolish the death penalty.

When changes to the law allowed the courts in 2013 to give out life sentences to drug convicts who were only acting as drug mules or suffering from mental illnesses, Cheong applied for re-sentencing. Being not certified as a courier, he was initially ineligible for re-sentencing and tried to fight for said certification. After new information was discovered, he was certified as a courier, with his death sentence being commuted to life imprisonment with 15 strokes of the cane in April 2015. Similarly, his accomplice, who suffered from depression at the time of the offence, was also re-sentenced to life imprisonment.

== Early life ==
Born on 7 September 1983, Cheong Chun Yin was the eldest child and son out of four children - two sons and two daughters - in his family. He was born in Perak, Malaysia. Cheong and his family moved to Johor Bahru, where Cheong grew up and went to school. Cheong completed his primary and secondary school education, and at age 17, he graduated and thus started working with his father, making a living by selling legitimate and pirated DVDs at a stall. Of all the four children, Cheong was his father’s most favourite child, and the closest to him.

In 2002, Cheong’s father Cheong Kah Pin (张家平 Zhāng Jiāpíng) and his wife divorced, and Cheong and his only brother (the fourth and youngest child) lived with his father while the daughters’ custody rights were given to Cheong’s mother. Eventually, Cheong Chun Yin became the only one out of his four siblings to remain with their father. Since young, Cheong wanted to become a policeman, but it was due to his family’s break-up which led to Cheong unable to fulfill his dream, and this may have also influenced him to trafficking drugs.

== Crime and court proceedings ==
=== Arrest and trial ===
On 16 June 2008, 24-year-old Cheong Chun Yin was arrested by the Central Narcotics Bureau (CNB) at Arab Street in Singapore, after the police received information that he allegedly passed a bag containing heroin to another person. Cheong was thus charged with drug trafficking. Under the Misuse of Drugs Act, should one traffick at least 15g of heroin, he/she will face the death penalty in Singapore. At the same time, Cheong’s 54-year-old accomplice Pang Siew Fum (彭秀芳 Péng Xiùfāng), a Malaysian, was captured in Toa Payoh, after Cheong passed her a bag containing around 2.726 kg of diamorphine at Changi Airport after he arrived in Singapore from Myanmar. There were also 5 kg of heroin found packed in two more bags inside Pang's HDB flat at Toa Payoh, where she and her Singaporean husband Chow Yoke Jee lived.

Cheong and Pang were later brought to trial together in the High Court of Singapore before one of its judges Choo Han Teck. Pang was represented by prominent lawyer Subhas Anandan and his two associates Irving Choh and Lim Bee Li, while Cheong was represented by both Ramesh Tiwary and Adrian Chong in his defence.

Cheong stated in his testimony that in 2006 he first met one of his regular customers, a man named Lau De, at his Malaysia’s disc stall. After knowing Lau De for two to three months, Cheong enquired about his line of business and even asked Lau De if there was any quick way to make money. Lau De replied that he was engaged in smuggling gold bars, thereby evading taxes. Cheong said that he did not believe Lau De at that time, thinking it would not be so easy to carry out such illegal activities. Later, after Lau De introduced to him a friend, who was decked in gold accessories, when he patronise his stall in March 2008, Cheong believed that Lau De was a gold smuggler and he thus accepted an offer to smuggle gold from Lau De two months later, which led to him travelling to Myanmar and later to Singapore where he received a bag from a middleman. The bag, Cheong said, was checked by him but he did not find drugs and only felt something hard in its interior sides and thus assumed they were gold. For this, the lawyers of Cheong argued that Cheong had no knowledge of the drugs and thus he should not be held liable to drug trafficking charges based on the presumption that he knew he was carrying drugs.

Pang, who worked as an assistant at her sister’s pork stall in Malaysia and also engaged in illegal booking, gave a similar account, in which she said she thought she was transporting valuables like penchants but not drugs. She said that a man called Teng Mor, whom she owed money since the 1990s, told her to help him deliver some valuables, which consisted of jade, blue sapphire, red ruby, diamonds and also Buddha pendants in a luggage (which she received from a Malay friend of Teng Mor), and she should be paid $5,000 for the job. She made a cursory check but could not find them. Nonetheless, she did not report to Teng Mor that the articles she was told to deliver were not in the suitcases, which happened to contain the heroin she was alleged to have delivered. After this, she was told by Teng Mor to meet up with Cheong, which led to their meeting at the airport and by then, Pang was already under the surveillance of the narcotics officers and this surveillance also contributed to her arrest, as well as Cheong's.

=== Sentence and appeals ===
On 4 February 2010, Justice Choo Han Teck found both Pang and Cheong guilty of drug trafficking. In a short, two-page written verdict, Justice Choo stated that both may argue that they did not know they were carrying drugs and assumed they were carrying valuables, but it was not believable from both Pang and Cheong’s accounts and claims. There was no alarm raised about the possibility of the bags not containing their intended contents when they checked and they could not have not noticed the drugs contained in the baggage if they were really unaware of drugs being present. It was likely that both of them were wilfully blind and told lies about not noticing they were carrying heroin, and thus they should be guilty of drug trafficking. In Cheong’s case, while he did provide details of the man “Lau De”, it was immaterial that the CNB did not make adequate efforts to trace “Lau De” or check on his cell-phones. Upon their conviction for drug trafficking, both Cheong and Pang were sentenced to death. Their appeals to the Court of Appeal of Singapore were later dismissed in November that same year. Cheong's application to reopen his concluded appeal for a re-trial was also rejected in October 2012.

During the time Cheong was undergoing trial and facing the death penalty, his family, who were shocked to hear his arrest, tried ways to help plead for mercy on his behalf. This tragedy ironically brought the separated family and divorced couple back together in their common goal to save Cheong, with Cheong’s father Cheong Kah Pin playing the most prominent role in the efforts to seek reprieve. Cheong’s father was said to be distraught about the guilty verdict of death, and he received the support of activists who also jointly asked for mercy on the lives of Cheong and another high-profile drug trafficker Yong Vui Kong, a 19-year-old Malaysian youth from Sabah who was also sentenced to hang for drug trafficking, due to both of them having been lured into helping do the drug trafficking and their trust exploited. Cheong’s father also sold his house to pay for legal fees and relentlessly asked for signatures from members of the public (including Yong Vui Kong's brothers). After gathering 8,778 signatures, Cheong's parents and siblings all knelt outside the Istana in order to pass a personal letter to the President of Singapore S R Nathan for clemency on Cheong Chun Yin. The clemency appeal was later turned down on the advice of the Cabinet to the president.

== Legal reforms and reprieve ==
=== Failed re-sentencing application and legal challenges ===
In July 2012, the Singapore government began its review of the death penalty laws, and they decided to initiate reforms, which took effect on 1 January 2013. Among the reforms introduced, those who are convicted of drug trafficking would not face execution if they were merely acting as couriers and had substantively assisted the authorities to fight drug related activities, or if they were suffering from mental illnesses at the time of their offences, and they would only face life imprisonment for their criminal conduct. All death row inmates who were found guilty of drug trafficking were given a chance to review their cases for re-sentencing and Cheong Chun Yin was allowed a chance to reopen his case. The reforms allowed Cheong’s fellow Malaysian and drug mule Yong Vui Kong to become the first drug courier to escape the death penalty and received life imprisonment and 15 strokes of the cane. While they rejoiced and welcomed the reprieve given to Yong, both the anti-death penalty groups Singapore Anti-Death Penalty Campaign (SADPC) and We Believe In Second Chances (WBSC) continued to advocate against Cheong's death sentence and argued that like Yong, Cheong rightfully deserves life imprisonment instead of death.

However, unlike Yong, Cheong Chun Yin remained on death row as the public prosecutor reviewed his case in November 2013 and found him ineligible for re-sentencing as he did not satisfy the criteria of a drug courier under Singapore’s revised death penalty laws for drug trafficking, given that he did not provide substantive assistance to the prosecution or authorities to tackle drug trafficking. His mental responsibility was not impaired according to psychiatric assessments, which would not make Cheong eligible for life imprisonment either. Hence, through his new lawyer M Ravi (who also represented Yong Vui Kong), Cheong went on to initiate a legal lawsuit to fight for certification as a courier. His lawsuit in June 2014 against the attorney general was later rejected by the High Court, and Ravi also had a complaint filed against him by the prosecution for releasing court documents to the media, which may potentially hinder fairness in the court proceedings. This case spurred the Malaysian government to appeal to Singapore for mercy on Cheong's life. There were also calls to investigate further on the information that Cheong had provided about the alleged mastermind "Lau De" who sent him to deliver drugs.

=== Certificate of substantive assistance ===
In September 2014, due to new information received and breakthroughs in investigation, the attorney general of Singapore decided to give Cheong a chance and reconsider his case. This also gave rise to hope and signalled that Cheong may tangibly receive a potential reprieve once the prosecution became satisfied that he was merely a courier upon the review of his case. Upon receiving this news, M Ravi was reportedly glad and he said that his client was also hopeful, and hence there was a consideration to withdraw their original appeal against the lawsuit's rejection (which was due for hearing on 24 November 2014) and instead launch an appeal for re-sentencing instead. Cheong's family were also glad to hear the news of a possible reprieve for Cheong, who turned 30 on 7 September (the same month of the review). The legal experts, in light of Cheong's initial loss of eligibility before his later eligibility, expressed that there should be more clearer guidelines on the issuance of certificates of substantive assistance for drug couriers, given there may be potential dampening of public confidence if a courier is wrongfully executed before new information was received and if the fresh details themselves were such that they were able to tangibly prove that the executed convict was merely acting as a courier all along.

In February 2015, Cheong was finally issued a certificate of substantive assistance as an eligible drug courier and he would be awaiting his next court appearance for re-sentencing before the original trial judge Choo Han Teck in the High Court. This gave joy and hope to Cheong's family; his father said this good news about his eldest son was the best gift to receive during Chinese New Year. Cheong’s partner-in-crime Pang Siew Fum, who was also applying to reduce her death sentence, would also appear in the same court session before the same judge as Cheong for her re-sentencing verdict as well, since their cases were related to each other. Initially, Cheong’s court appearance date was scheduled on 23 March 2015, but due to the suspension of his lawyer M Ravi as a result of his bipolar disorder relapse, Cheong’s re-sentencing trial was postponed to a month later on 20 April 2015. Cheong's father said in a news report that his son was in good spirits and had gained weight while in prison, and often, he would wake up early in the morning to travel from Johor to Singapore weekly to visit his eldest son in jail. The elderly man also volunteered at a vegetable farm to plant vegetables to sell in order to raise money to pay his son's legal fees, and was extremely grateful to his son's lawyer and the kindness of his friends and the public who heard about Cheong's case.

=== Commutation of death sentence ===
On 20 April 2015, the High Court revoked 31-year-old Cheong Chun Yin's death sentence and re-sentenced him to a mandatory term of life imprisonment with effect from the date of his arrest, although he has to receive the mandatory minimum of 15 strokes of the cane, as required for all drug couriers who were certified and had given substantive assistance. This allowed Cheong to effectively escape the gallows for his crime. Justice Choo Han Teck, in overturning Cheong's death sentence, stated he was satisfied that Cheong indeed acted as a drug runner based on the supporting documents provided by the prosecution to show how he substantively assisted the authorities to tackle drug trafficking activities. Cheong was reportedly the fourth certified drug runner from Singapore's death row whose original death sentence was commuted after Yong Vui Kong, Subashkaran Pragasam and Yip Mun Hei, all of whom also received similar sentences of life and caning under the newly enacted laws.

In the same trial and court, much to the relief of her relatives in court, 60-year-old Pang Siew Fum was also given an approval of her re-sentencing application despite failing to meet the criteria of a courier, as psychiatrists assessed and found Pang to be suffering from major depressive disorder which sufficiently impaired her mental responsibility. After Pang's lawyers presented the medical report to the court, Justice Choo accepted that Pang should not be hanged based on her diminished responsibility. Hence Pang, by gaining eligibility under the alternative re-sentencing criteria, was re-sentenced to life imprisonment from the date of her capture, and no caning was imposed due to her being a female. Even if Pang was a male, she would not face caning as well because firstly, regardless of his or her gender, a mentally ill drug trafficker can serve a mandatory life sentence without caning, and secondly, her age being above fifty and it would not be legal for offenders (often the males) above fifty years old to be caned. Pang was likely the third drug trafficker on death row to have her sentence commuted due to a mental illness after Dinesh Pillai Reja Retnam and Wilkinson Primus in March and October 2014 respectively, and both were also, like Pang, diagnosed with depression at the time they committed their respective crimes.

=== Reactions to Cheong's life sentence verdict ===
Cheong’s re-sentencing and reprieve brought much relief to his family (who all appeared in court), especially his father, as they finally got to witness Cheong escaping the hangman’s noose. Besides, with good behaviour behind bars, and having had his 7-year death row period included into his sentence, Cheong would only need to serve at least 13 more years before he can be reviewed for eligibility of release on parole based on his prison conduct after at least 20 years of his life sentence and he can return to his family in Malaysia after his release; his earliest release date will be sometime in or after June 2028.

Cheong's new lawyer Louis Joseph (who replaced M Ravi in April 2015) stated to reporters that the outcome in Cheong's case might also happen in some other future cases of re-sentencing, as he commented that presently, most of the drug traffickers on death row in Singapore did the crime out of stupidity and desperation and were merely runners for the real kingpins who do not dare to come to Singapore to face execution. As the drug mules caught were more willing to give information about their bosses and confess in view of the increased chance to not face death, there was a speculated likelihood that very few drug traffickers could get the death penalty.

Still, the outcome was quite bittersweet for Cheong’s then 59-year-old father, who feared that given his ailing health (due to diabetes and high blood pressure) and advanced age, he would not live long enough to have a chance to see his son regaining his freedom again, though some of the activists, who were concerned for his welfare, tried to console him. He also felt his son did not deserve to be jailed since he was innocent and was lured into doing the deed. Cheong also wrote letters in Chinese to both the High Court and the Malaysian embassy in Singapore about his feelings of injustice over the fact that he had to be in jail for a long time over a small mistake he committed due to Lau De misleading him into doing so.

Rachel Zeng, one of the anti-death penalty activists, expressed that she and the other activists were in relief that Cheong was finally spared the gallows after the efforts they made to appeal for mercy on his life. However, she said on the side note that on the same day, she also attended the court hearing of two Malaysians Micheal Anak Garing and Tony Anak Imba, who were charged with robbing and murdering an Indian worker, and felt saddened when the High Court judge Choo Han Teck, who was coincidentally the same judge that commuted the death sentences of Cheong and Pang, sentenced one of the defendants, Micheal, to death while sentencing Tony to life imprisonment and 24 strokes of the cane.

== Imprisonment ==
During his period of incarceration at Changi Prison, Cheong continued to receive weekly visits from his father who regularly traveled across the border from Malaysia to Singapore to see his son, and Cheong himself became devoted to Christianity while in prison, seeking redemption and divine forgiveness for his crime. Cheong even sent a Bible to his father and younger brother, who was married with two sons, and hoped that they and his nephews could read it. He also asked his brother to educate his sons to be good people and do not go astray like him.

On 22 April 2022, Cheong's case was mentioned again when Sebaran Kasih, a non-governmental organisation, appealed for all political and business leaders to bring forward diplomatic measures to intervene in the case of Nagaenthran K. Dharmalingam, whose execution was scheduled on 27 April 2022 after losing his final appeal. The group cited the 2010 cases of Cheong and Pang Siew Fum to question why unlike Cheong and Pang, Nagaenthran was found ineligible for life imprisonment since their cases were similar in terms of their circumstances (referring to Cheong being a certified courier and Pang suffering from a mental illness). Despite the efforts of Sebaran Kasih and many other parties (including the United Nations, Amnesty International and European Union), 33-year-old Nagaenthran was hanged at dawn as scheduled at Changi Prison.

On 18 July 2022, it was reported in the Malaysian media that Cheong's father was still making regular prison visits to see his son, except for the two-year period when the borders between Malaysia and Singapore were closed due to the 2020 COVID-19 pandemic and its resulting travel restrictions. It was also reported that based on his conduct in jail, Cheong had at least six more years left to serve out of his life term before he can be released from prison on parole. Cheong's father expressed in an interview that he hoped to continue to live till the moment when he reunite with his son upon his release. He mentioned that Cheong's grandmother (in her nineties), who was close to Cheong since his childhood, had dementia and could not recognize some of her family members but she still remembered and missed her eldest grandson. Cheong's father ended the interview with his hope that Cheong can get to reunite with his grandmother once he got paroled and regained his freedom.

In February 2023, Cheong Chun Yin's father made the news once again when he expressed his hope to seek local lawmakers' help to apply to the Government of Singapore for a further reduction of his son's sentence. He also updated that his son resumed his studies and also did some work while in prison. Cheong's 67-year-old father, who lived alone in a small rented house at Johor, remained working as a farmer and vegetable seller to make ends meet, since he sold his three houses to settle the legal fees and seek mercy for Cheong. According to Cheong's father, Cheong's grandmother died in December 2022; she reportedly had a last wish to see her grandson being released from prison before her death.

Netizens in Singapore were touched to hear about the fatherly love Cheong's father showed to his son, which was the motivation for him to travel regularly to visit his son despite his old age, and expressed their intention to help him, but Cheong's father politely declined. Nevertheless, Cheong's father was grateful to the kindness of the strangers who approached him, including those who came to his vegetable stall to buy his vegetables. Cheong's father expressed that he hoped the Singapore authorities can consider amend some of their life imprisonment laws in their legislation, to allow all inmates and Cheong to have a chance to obtain parole earlier on account of good behaviour in prison. According to Liow Cai Tung, a Malaysian politician and member of Democratic Action Party, Cheong's father came to her office with the money donated to him from members of the public, and he asked Liow to use the donation funds to help those who were less privileged than him.

In June 2026, Cheong's father, then 70 years old, revealed in an interview that he still made regular trips to Singapore to visit his son.

== See also ==
- List of major crimes in Singapore
- Capital punishment in Singapore
- Life imprisonment in Singapore
- Yong Vui Kong
- Nagaenthran K. Dharmalingam
- Pannir Selvam Pranthaman
- Caning in Singapore
