= M. Ravi =

Singaporean lawyer (1969–2025)

- எம். ரவி
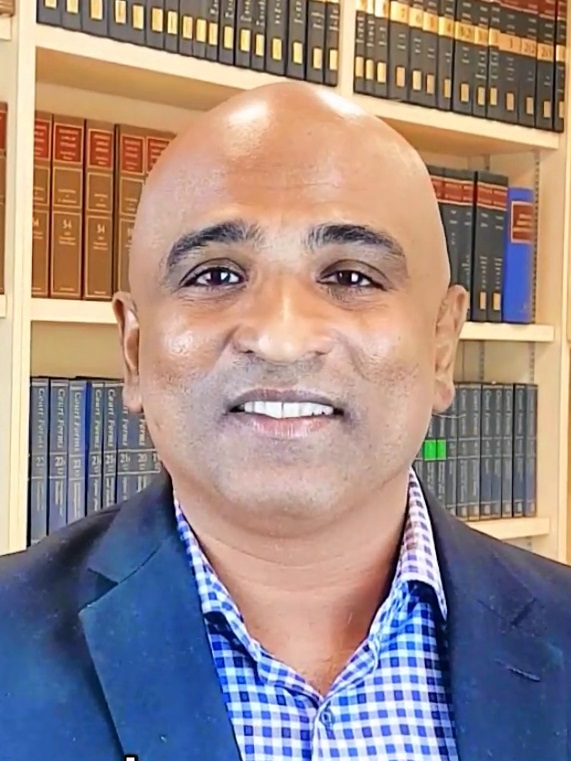
- Ravi in 2019
- Born: Ravi s/o Madasamy; 9 April 1969; Singapore
- Died: 24 December 2025 (aged 56); Singapore
- Education: Cardiff University (LLB); National University of Singapore (BA)
- Notable work: Land of Good English (2004); Hung at Dawn (2005); M Ravi: Kampong Boy (2013)

Ravi Madasamy (Note: Tamil: ரவி மாடசாமி, romanized: Ravi Māṭacāmi) (9 April 1969 – 24 December 2025), better known as M. Ravi, was a Singaporean international human rights lawyer and activist. Known for his work as a cause lawyer, he acted in multiple leading cases in Singaporean constitutional law and human rights.

After graduating from the National University of Singapore and Cardiff University, Ravi qualified and practised law in Singapore. He was defence counsel for death row inmates Yong Vui Kong, Gobi Avedian, and Cheong Chun Yin, all of whom had their death sentences separately commuted to jail terms. Throughout his career, he sought judicial review against the Singapore government on human rights issues, including the constitutionality of Section 377A, freedom of expression, and voting rights, which led to judicial and political changes.

Ravi was an activist for death penalty abolition and LGBT rights. He ran in the 2015 general election as a Reform Party (RP) candidate for Ang Mo Kio Group Representation Constituency (GRC) and lost to the governing People's Action Party (PAP). For his advocacy and pro-bono work, Ravi received recognition from international activists and NGOs (non-governmental organisations), including Richard Branson, Amnesty International, the International Bar Association (IBA), and Human Rights Watch. In 2023, he was awarded the IBA Human Rights Award. He died on 24 December 2025.

== Early life ==
Ravi Madasamy was born on 9 April 1969. He was the sixth of seven children to parents of Tamil descent. His father was a construction worker while his mother was a homemaker. After attending Deyi Secondary School and Anderson Junior College, he graduated from the National University of Singapore with a Bachelor of Arts degree in political science and sociology. He subsequently completed a Bachelor of Laws degree at Cardiff University in Wales.

== Legal career ==
=== Early career (1996–2006) ===
Ravi was called to the bar in 1996 and began to practise law in Singapore. Initially having a general practice, Ravi was approached by opposition politician J. B. Jeyaretnam in 2003 to defend Vignes Mourthi, an inmate on death row for smuggling heroin into Singapore. The case was Ravi's first capital punishment case and marked his transition into specialising in such cases after six years of practice.

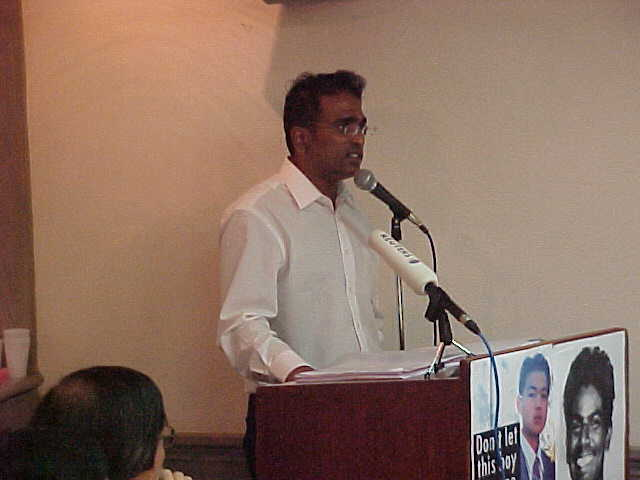
Ravi speaking at a 2005 forum for death row inmates Shanmugam Murugesu and Van Tuong Nguyen

In 2004, Ravi represented Shanmugam s/o Murugesu, a taxi driver sentenced to death for smuggling cannabis, in Public Prosecutor v Shanmugam s/o Murugesu. After an unsuccessful appeal, Ravi led a public campaign to petition S. R. Nathan, the President of Singapore, to pardon Shanmugam, organising events protesting against the death penalty and Shanmugam's execution. President S. R. Nathan did not issue a pardon, and Shanmugam was hanged. In the same year, Ravi defended Chee Soon Juan's sister, Chee Siok Chin in a case brought by and represented a number of political protestors in Chee Siok Chin v Minister for Home Affairs on Singapore's constitutional right to free speech.

=== Cause lawyering (2006–2021) ===
In 2008, Ravi represented opposition politician Chee Soon Juan and his sister Chee Siok Chin in a defamation lawsuit against them by Lee Hsien Loong, the Prime Minister of Singapore, and Lee's father, former Prime Minister Lee Kuan Yew. Reuters and The New York Times noted that the waging of lawsuits by Singaporean political leaders have been criticised as attempts to "cripple opposition politicians". Ravi later defended other opposition politicians and dissidents in lawsuits against them by politicians from the ruling party. These included Roy Ngerng, who was sued by Prime Minister Lee Hsien Loong for defamation; Daniel de Costa, who was charged with criminal defamation for op-eds written on members of the Cabinet of Singapore; and John Tan, who applied for a declaration that his contempt of court conviction did not disqualify him from standing for elections.

In 2011, Ravi launched a constitutional challenge in the High Court after his client, Tan Eng Hong, was arrested and charged under Section 377A of the Penal Code, which criminalised gay sex. Tan was charged under Section 377A in 2010, despite the Singapore government stating in parliament that they would no longer prosecute citizens under the law. After years of proceedings, the Court of Appeal ruled that Section 377A was not unconstitutional. The case was described by The Guardian as a "milestone in the struggle against Section 377A". In the same year, Ravi represented British writer Alan Shadrake in Shadrake v Attorney-General after Shadrake was charged with and convicted of scandalising the Singapore judicial system. Another constitutional law case Ravi took up was Vellama d/o Marie Muthu v Attorney-General, which involved Vellama d/o Marie Muthu, a cleaner, bringing a lawsuit against the Singapore government for not holding a by-election after opposition member of parliament Yaw Shin Leong was expelled from the Workers' Party and consequently lost his parliamentary seat.

From 2009 to 2015, Ravi represented Yong Vui Kong, a Malaysian citizen sentenced to death for drug trafficking. The landmark case raised legal issues concerning human rights, including the constitutionality of judicial caning, as well as the reviewability of the clemency process and the exercise of prosecutorial discretion. After six years of hearings, the Singapore government made changes to the laws on the death penalty for drug trafficking. During a re-sentencing trial in the High Court, Ravi successfully appealed for Yong to have his death sentence commuted to a lower sentence of life imprisonment with the possibility of parole after 20 years, as well as 15 strokes of the cane. Ravi later appealed against the caning sentence, arguing that it was unconstitutional, prejudicial, and a form of torture. The Court of Appeal dismissed the appeal, which Ravi described as "[bringing Singapore] back to the Middle Ages".

Shortly after, Ravi successfully reopened the case of death row inmate Cheong Chun Yin, who also had his death sentence commuted to life imprisonment and 15 strokes of the cane under the new laws on capital punishment. Ravi later acted for the death row inmates Norasharee Gous (who was later executed in 2022) and Gobi Avedian, which were the second and third cases in Singapore's legal history that the Court of Appeal agreed to reopen and review. He was successful in Gobi's appeal, which resulted in Gobi's sentence reduced to 15 years' jail and ten strokes of the cane, marking the second time in Singapore's legal history that a death row inmate was spared on appeal to the Court of Appeal despite the exhaustion of all avenues of appeal. Gobi was released from prison on 17 December 2024.

=== Private practice, cost orders and suspension (2015–2024) ===
In 2015, after Ravi's psychiatrist diagnosed Ravi as being hypomanic and stated that Ravi's hypomania created risk of errors of judgment, erratic and abnormal behaviour and emotional outbursts, the Law Society of Singapore suspended Ravi from practising law until he submitted to a medical examination by his psychiatrist or a certified consultant psychiatrist.

In 2019, Ravi criticised prosecutors and judges in Singapore for a lack of impartiality. He later apologised and withdrew the statements. The disciplinary tribunal of the Law Society later found that Ravi should be fined at least S$10,000, finding him guilty of two charges of misconduct under the Legal Profession Act.

In October 2020, Ravi alleged that there was a "miscarriage of justice" and that prosecutors were "wrongdoers" and had been "overzealous" in their prosecution of Gobi Avedian. A month later, he filed a civil suit on Gobi's behalf against a number of prosecutors, alleging that they had abused their powers and acted in bad faith. The Attorney-General's Chambers disputed Ravi's claims and filed a disciplinary complaint to the Law Society for possible professional misconduct. The Law Society's disciplinary tribunal found Ravi innocent of the first charge but guilty of three other charges. The Attorney-General's Chambers appealed the decision to the High Court on the first charge, seeking a guilty verdict on the charge, but the court affirmed the tribunal's decision and dismissed the appeal. The Law Society appealed the decision to the Supreme Court, which, on 22 March 2023, found Ravi guilty of misconduct and suspended him from practice for five years. In response to the judgment, a number of international non-governmental organisations, including Human Rights Watch, Amnesty International, and the Union Internationale des Avocats criticised Ravi's suspension on the grounds of infringing upon his freedom of expression.

On 16 December 2020, Ravi was charged with criminal defamation after he published a post on his Facebook page alleging that Minister for Law K. Shanmugam "controls" Chief Justice Sundaresh Menon. On 3 March 2021, the Attorney-General's Chambers issued a warning to Ravi in lieu of continuing the criminal proceedings, after he deleted the post, apologised, and undertook not to repeat the allegations.

On 14 May 2021, the Court of Appeal ordered Ravi to pay S$5,000 to the prosecution after they found that he had acted improperly in making an "unmeritorious" bid to reopen the case of convicted drug trafficker Syed Suhail bin Syed Zin, whom Ravi had represented pro bono. The court said that Ravi had brought an application without any real basis, misrepresented certain facts in his affidavit, and made baseless allegations against Syed Suhail's former lawyer without giving him a chance to respond. In response, the International Bar Association and International Committee of Jurists condemned the courts' decision as a "troubling instance where the courts appear to have adopted an overly expansive and impermissible interpretation of what constitutes 'lack of merit'". Former Malaysian member of parliament N. Surendran criticised the move, calling the cost order an example of "persecution". The International Committee of Jurists, Amnesty International, and Civicus have described the Singapore government's actions against Ravi as harassment of human rights lawyers.

In May 2024, Ravi was disbarred by the Court of Three Judges for making comments about the Singapore government and improper conduct during the proceedings of a trial.

Ravi was the founding director of M Ravi Law, a firm with offices across Southeast Asia.

=== Impact ===
As a lawyer, Ravi was known for his aggressive trial advocacy, having been described by Asia Sentinel as "perhaps Singapore's most prominent defence lawyer". Human Rights Watch has described Ravi's work as having made "Singapore a better, more humane place". Al Jazeera has described Ravi as "perhaps Singapore's most vocal anti-death penalty advocate". Mark Findlay, a law professor at the Singapore Management University, describes Ravi as a "respected human rights advocate". George Baylon Radics, a lecturer at the National University of Singapore, writes in the Columbia Human Rights Law Review that "Ravi [is] one of Singapore's most preeminent human rights attorneys... a staunch lawyer for social change." Jothie Rajah, writing in an article published in the Wisconsin International Law Journal, states that:

Ravi's impact as a cause lawyer has undoubtedly had some effect on the way the Singapore government has approached death penalty cases... [T]he visibility and presence of Ravi as a cause lawyer, the exception to the Singapore general rule, in some way created the conditions of possibility for other lawyers to step up and play the role of cause lawyer... It may well be that Ravi is the only lawyer in Singapore who can, at the present time, justifiably lay claim to being called a cause lawyer.

In 2019, Ravi began representing Nagaenthran K. Dharmalingam, a Malaysian citizen sentenced to death for smuggling drugs into Singapore. On appeal, Ravi argued that Nagaenthran was intellectually disabled, an argument that was dismissed. The case drew the attention of international activists, including Richard Branson, who criticised the court's decision and Singapore's use of the death penalty. Branson's activism led Minister for Law K. Shanmugam to publicly challenge Branson to a live debate on the death penalty, which Branson declined. In Branson's response, he described Ravi as "courageous".

On 2 November 2023, Ravi was awarded the 2023 IBA Award for Outstanding Contribution by a Legal Practitioner to Human Rights by the International Bar Association for his work on LGBT rights and the death penalty.

== Activism and political career ==
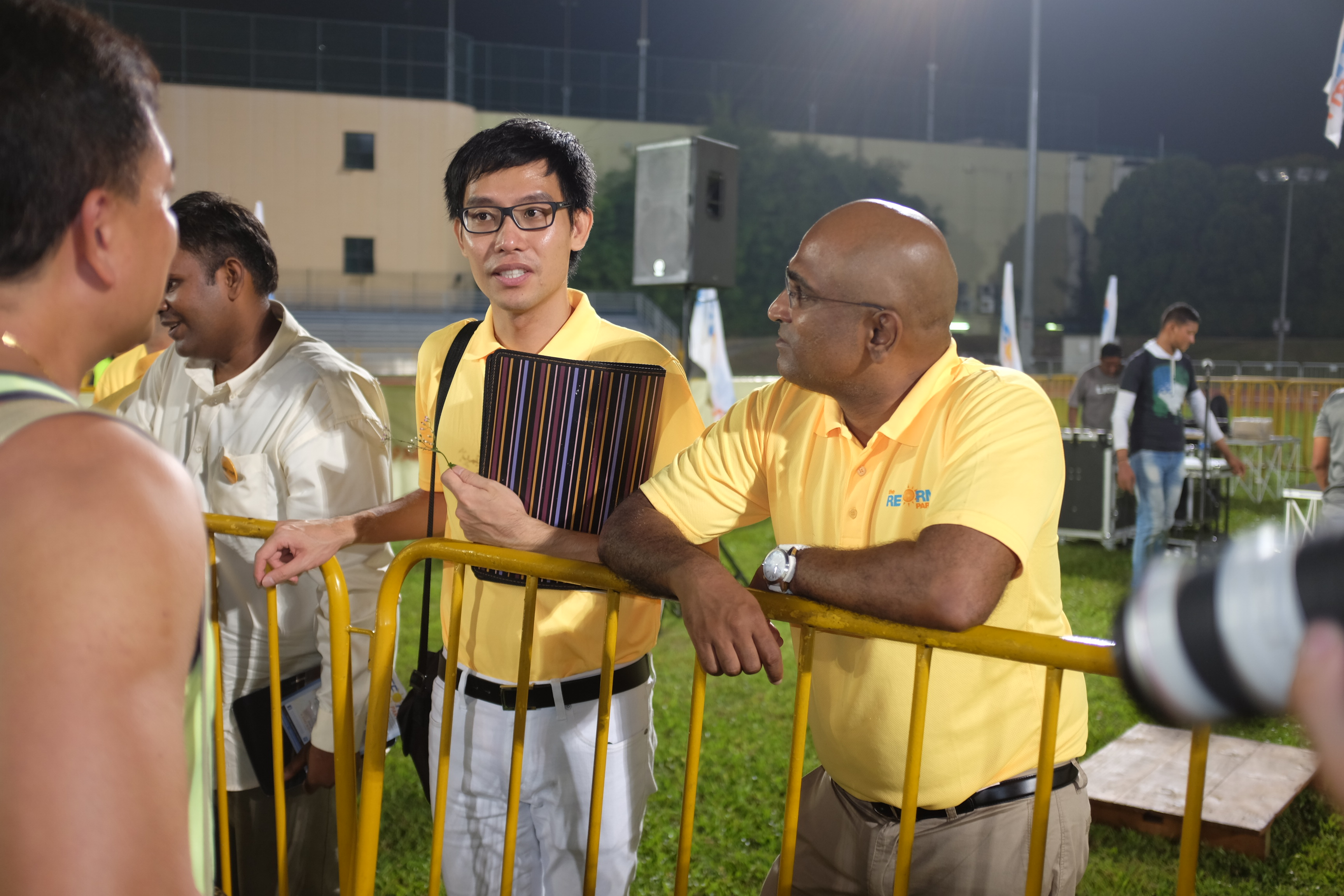
Ravi attending a Reform Party rally with fellow member Roy Ngerng during the 2015 general election, whom he had previously defended.

Ravi was an activist for death penalty abolishment and LGBT rights. After the Court of Appeal dismissed Malaysian citizen Yong Vui Kong's appeal against his death sentence for drug trafficking, Ravi lobbied Malaysian politicians and launched an activist movement in Singapore to appeal to President of Singapore S. R. Nathan for clemency. Although the movement managed to garner over 100,000 signatures in a petition, they were ultimately unsuccessful in obtaining presidential clemency for Yong. When Kho Jabing, a convicted murderer, was sentenced to death in 2016, Ravi, in the capacity of an activist, applied for a motion in-person to stall the execution despite not having represented Kho in the case.

In 2014, Ravi was awarded the Asia Pink Award, an LGBT rights advocacy prize by Element Magazine, for his pro-bono work in challenging the legality of Section 377A.

Ravi stood for election during the 2015 general election, joining a six-member Reform Party team in contesting Ang Mo Kio GRC. The Reform Party lost to the governing People's Action Party after garnering 21.36% of the vote. In October 2023, police reports were made against Ravi and Iris Koh after they allegedly published multiple social posts during the cooling-off period for the 2023 Singaporean presidential election.

== Personal life ==
=== Bipolar disorder ===
In 2006, Ravi was diagnosed with bipolar disorder, a condition his mother also had. He had previously experienced multiple manic episodes in public, including at Hong Lim Park and places of worship. He had been temporarily suspended from legal practice on a number of occasions, owing to his medical condition and conduct. In August 2015, Human Rights Watch recommended the Law Society of Singapore to ask "the government to promptly extend Ravi's certificate to practise law... [to] ensure that it was acting in line with the Disability Rights Convention."

==== Criminal proceedings ====
In November 2017, whilst on a manic episode, Ravi broke into Eugene Thuraisingam's law firm, where he had previously worked, and assaulted Jeannette Chong-Aruldoss and another lawyer. He was sentenced to mandatory psychiatric treatment for the attacks and trespass.

In July 2023, Ravi was charged with assault and disorderly behaviour in public for slapping a man and shouting at Yio Chu Kang MRT station. In September 2023, Ravi was charged for voluntarily causing hurt, disorderly behaviour in public and harassment, after slapping a woman in Sri Mariamman Temple and verbally harassing two other people. He was sentenced to 14 weeks jail in 2024. In issuing the sentence, the District Judge did not consider Ravi's bipolar disorder mitigating due to his poor management of the condition and a history of previous offences.

On 8 November 2023, Ravi was sentenced to 21 days of imprisonment for contempt of court. In the judgment, the High Court ruled that although Ravi had a hypomanic episode when he made the contemptuous statement, his bipolar disorder would not be greatly considered in mitigation. The trial judge Hoo Sheau Peng decided that Ravi's condition did not materially affect his decision-making ability, and found that he had not been compliant with his medication regime.

=== Publications ===
In 2014, Ravi wrote an autobiography, Kampong Boy, which was shortlisted for the Singapore Literature Prize.

=== Death ===
Ravi died on 24 December 2025 at the age of 56 after being admitted unconscious to Tan Tock Seng Hospital. He had exhibited "concerning" symptoms while allegedly consuming drugs with a 40-year-old male friend in an apartment along Upper Boon Keng Road. The friend called paramedics to the scene; he was subsequently arrested under the Misuse of Drugs Act and charged for arranging the gathering with the purpose of consuming methamphetamine. The death is under a police investigation for unnatural deaths, with the cause yet to be determined.

== Notable cases ==
- Vignes Mourthi (2003)
- Public Prosecutor v Shanmugam s/o Murugesu (2004)
- Chee Siok Chin v Minister for Home Affairs (2005)
- Lee Hsien Loong v Singapore Democratic Party and Others and Another Suit (2008)
- Public Prosecutor v Yong Vui Kong (2009–2015)
- Shadrake v Attorney-General (2011)
- Ravinthran Ramalingam v Attorney-General (2011)
- Tan Eng Hong v Attorney-General (2012)
- Kenneth Jeyaretnam v Attorney-General (2013)
- Vellama d/o Marie Muthu v Attorney-General (2013)
- Cheong Chun Yin v Attorney-General (2014)
- James Raj Arokiasamy v Attorney-General (2014)
- Gobi a/l Avedian v Public Prosecutor (2020)
- Iskandar bin Rahmat v Public Prosecutor (2021)
- Public Prosecutor v Nagaenthran a/l K. Dharmalingam (2022)
- Iskandar bin Rahmat v Attorney-General (2022)

== Bibliography ==
- Land of Good English (2004)
- Hung at Dawn (2005)
- M Ravi: Kampong Boy (2013)
- "The Abolition of the Death Penalty in Southeast Asia: The Arduous March Forward" in The Universal Periodic Review of Southeast Asia (2017)
