= Roy Ngerng =

Singaporean blogger (born 1981)

- 鄞義林
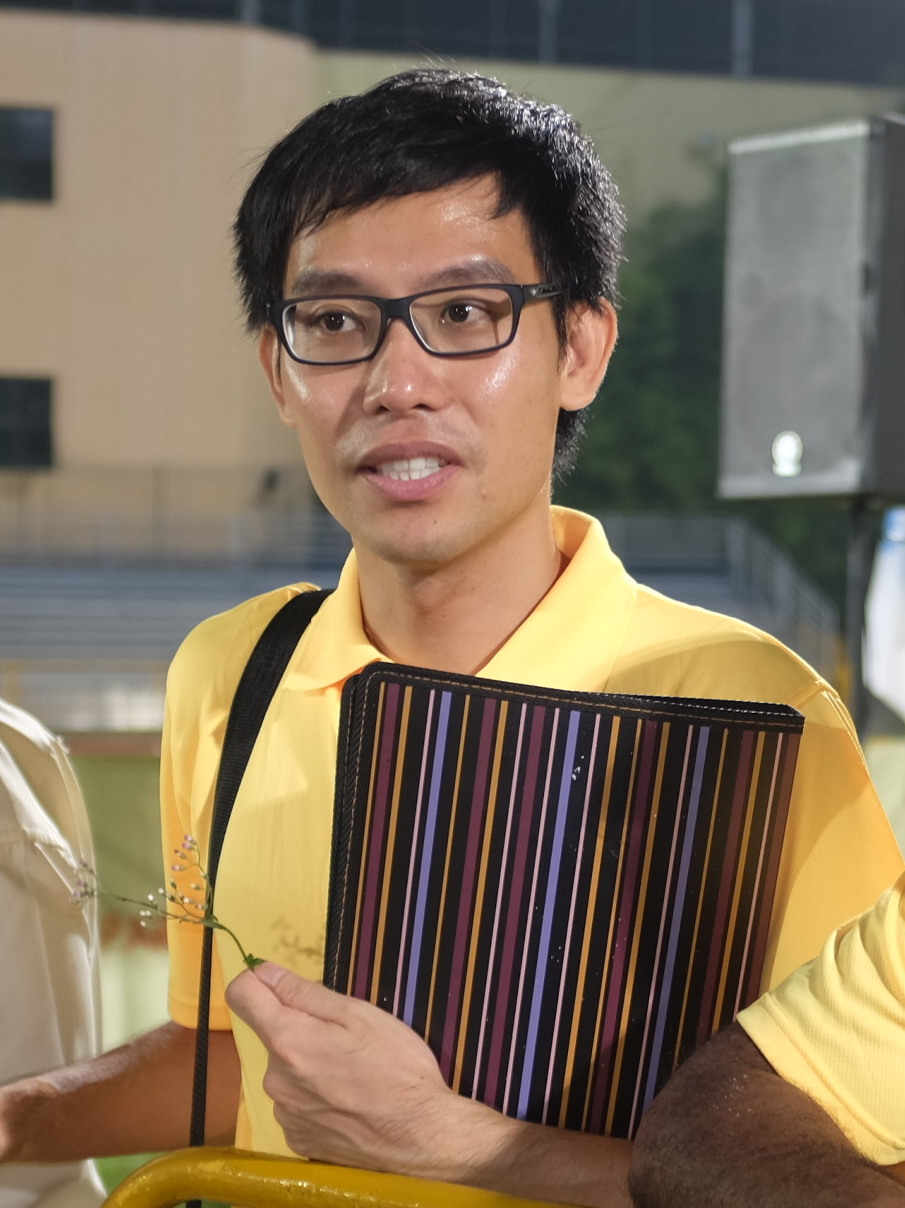
- Ngerng in 2015
- Born: 9 May 1981 (age 45); Singapore
- Education: National University of Singapore
- Occupation: Blogger
- Other political affiliations: Reform Party (2015–2016)

Roy Ngerng Yi Ling (Note: traditional Chinese: 鄞義林; simplified Chinese: 鄞义林; pinyin: Yín Yìlín) (born 9 May 1981) is a Singaporean blogger, activist and former politician. He gained national attention in 2015 when he was found liable for defaming Lee Hsien Loong, the former prime minister. In a blog post, Ngerng accused Lee of being a "thief" and of criminally misappropriating monies paid by citizens to the state-administered Central Provident Fund (CPF). The court ruled that his accusation was malicious and unfounded, calling it "one of the gravest that can be made against any individual, let alone a head of government", and he was ordered to pay defamation damages amounting to S$150,000 (US$111,940.3).

In the 2015 general election, Ngerng joined the opposition Reform Party (RP) and contested as part of a team in Ang Mo Kio GRC, running against the People's Action Party (PAP) team. The team secured only 21.4 percent of the vote, the second lowest share among all contested GRCs. Following the election, Ngerng moved to Taiwan in 2016 and has since remained largely absent from Singapore's public and political scene.

== Early life and education ==
Ngerng's father was a chai tow kway hawker and his mother a retired factory worker. He lived with his parents, younger sister and, later, an elder sister in a four-room Housing Development Board (HDB) flat in Sembawang. Before 2000, the family resided in a two-room flat near the now-defunct Hong Dao Primary School, which he attended. His family was unaware of his blogging until May 2014. Ngerng has said that his interest in social issues began in primary school and that he came out as gay at the age of 15.

Ngerng attended the Hong Dao Primary School for a few years then transferred to Ang Mo Kio Primary School. He later studied at Mayflower Secondary School, and Serangoon Junior College, where he took art as a subject for the GCE A-Level. He later majored in sociology at the National University of Singapore, where he joined a community service club involved with children and individuals with developmental and psychiatric conditions.

== Career ==
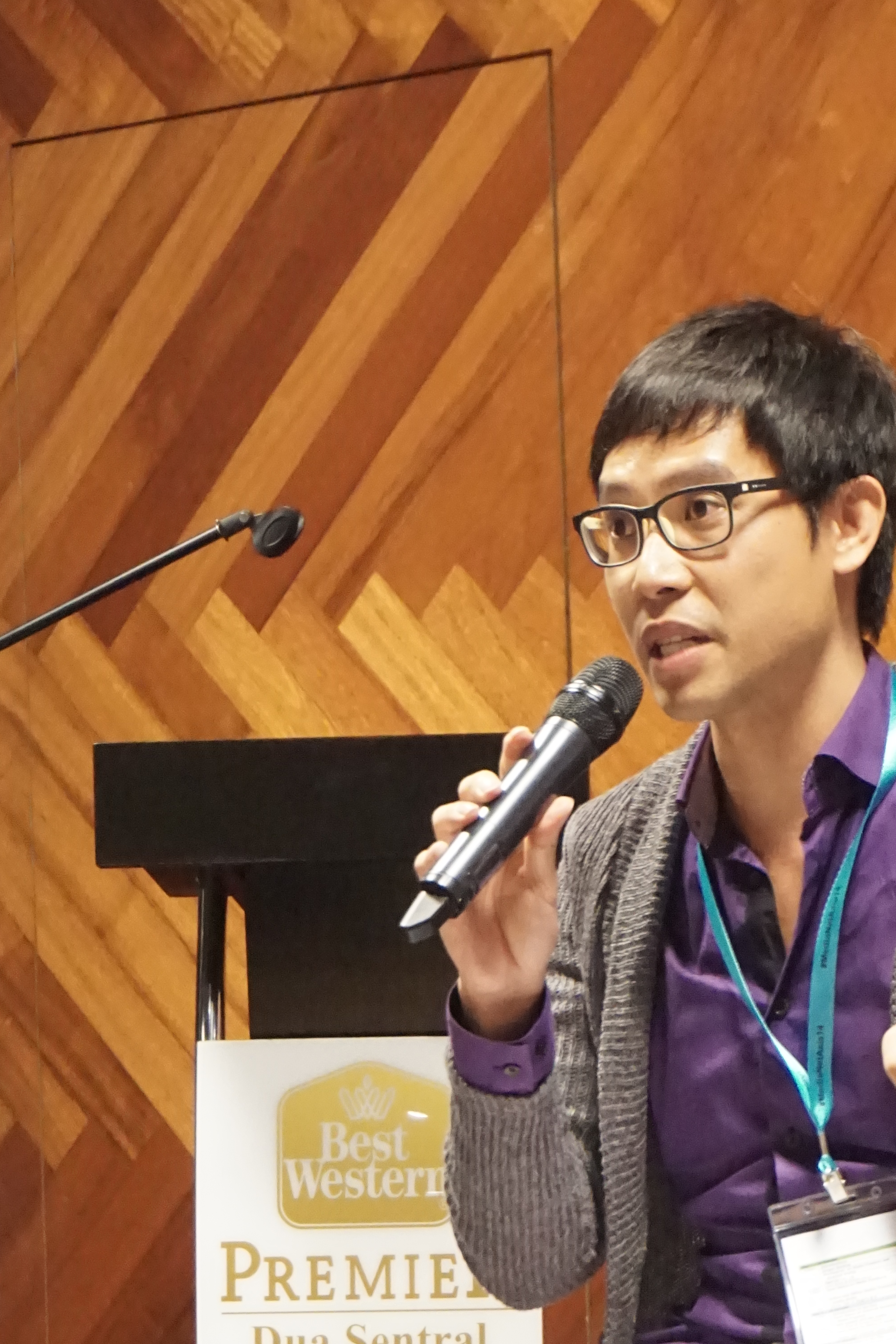
Ngerng speaking at the Regional Conference on Media and Internet Freedom 2014 in Kuala Lumpur.

After graduating, Ngerng worked for six months with Autism Partnership, an organisation supporting families with autistic children. He subsequently joined the Health Promotion Board's Communicable Diseases department, where he remained for six years. In 2012, he began working at Tan Tock Seng Hospital (TTSH) as a contract patient coordinator. On 10 June 2014, TTSH terminated his employment, citing "conduct incompatible with the values and standards expected of employees" and misuse of workplace resources for personal activities. Ngerng described the dismissal as "politically motivated". In the same month, a 71-year-old man, Loh Thiam Hock, was sentenced to four weeks' imprisonment for vandalising public property with messages supporting Ngerng.

=== Political career ===
In 2014, Ngerng submitted an application to be a Nominated Member of Parliament (NMP), with fellow blogger Han Hui Hui endorsing his candidacy. He was not selected when the list of appointed NMPs was announced in August 2014.

In 2015, Ngerng was part of the Reform Party (RP) six-member team contesting Ang Mo Kio Group Representation Constituency in the 2015 general election. The People's Action Party (PAP) team led by Prime Minister Lee Hsien Loong won the contest with 135,115 votes (78.63 percent), defeating RP's 36,711 votes (21.37 percent).

In 2018, Ngerng appeared in an Al Jazeera documentary titled Singapore: The House that Lee Built. This was his first media appearance since the 2015 general election and included coverage of his life in Taiwan.

== Controversies ==
=== Libel suit over CPF blog post ===
Ngerng started his sociopolitical blog, The Heart Truths, in 2012.

On 15 May 2014, Ngerng made a post entitled "Where Your CPF Money Is Going: Learning From The City Harvest Trial" on his blog the Heart Truths. Within the post, Ngerng created a chart which mapped the relationships between Prime Minister Lee Hsien Loong, the Central Provident Fund (CPF), the Monetary Authority of Singapore (MAS), Temasek Holdings and the Government of Singapore Investment Corporation (GIC). Ngerng claimed there was an "uncanny resemblance" between this chart and another chart by news agency Channel News Asia regarding the relationship among City Harvest Church leaders, who were being charged with misappropriating funds.

The CPF has been described as "a forced savings scheme" for Singaporeans with "monthly contributions into the fund" to be saved for retirement, or for expenses on "property, healthcare, and their children's education", while the GIC has been described to have "indirectly invested" funds from the CPF.

On 18 May, Lee's lawyer, Senior counsel Davinder Singh of Drew & Napier, stated that the blog post alleged that Lee "is guilty of criminal misappropriation of the monies paid by Singaporeans to the CPF" and that the allegations were "false and baseless". It was demanded that Ngerng issue an apology and take down the blog post within three days, as well as pay damages and legal fees, failing which Ngerng could be sued for defamation. On 19 May, Ngerng took down the offending blog post but did not apologise and said that the offending article was a call for greater transparency on the CPF, the GIC and Temasek Holdings. He then posted another blog post entitled "Your CPF: The Complete Truth And Nothing But The Truth". Around this time, Singapore human rights non-governmental organisation Maruah called for Lee to rebut the points made in Ngerng's blog post. After an extension for the deadline for Ngerng's written response was granted, Ngerng apologised "unreservedly" on 23 May, admitting that his allegation was "false and completely without foundation". Ngerng also asked that he not pay for damages and legal fees, while requesting an "open dialogue" with Lee on the CPF. Ngerng's appeal to drop damages and costs was rejected.

On 26 May, Singh sent a letter to Ngerng, saying that four further blog posts by Ngerng and a 24 May YouTube video showed that Ngerng's apology was not "genuine". If Ngerng did not take down this material, aggravated damages would be claimed. Ngerng agreed to remove the additional posts and video. On 27 May, Ngerng offered S$5,000 in damages "with each party to bear their own costs", which was rejected by Singh as "derisory". Meanwhile, Singh said that Ngerng had once again "misled" Lee and the public by not removing his YouTube video as agreed upon, claimed that the video was merely made private, and alleged that Ngerng had sent two emails with links to the posts and video to "a far wider audience" including local and international media. In response, Ngerng's lawyer, M Ravi, claimed no knowledge of the emails.

On 29 May, Lee filed a defamation lawsuit against Ngerng. In response, Ngerng made an online plea for help in settling his legal fees through crowdfunding, leaving instructions on how to transfer money to his bank account. Within a week, Ngerng said that he had raised more than his targeted S$70,000. It was later reported that Ngerng had managed to raise more than S$110,000 from over a thousand contributions. While Lee did not address the case directly, he wrote on Facebook that "freedom of speech does not come free from the need to be responsible for what one says, either online or offline". Singaporean writer Catherine Lim has criticised the lawsuit against Ngerng.

On 17 June, Ngerng's defence was filed in court by his lawyer, M Ravi, who stated that Ngerng had never intended to accuse Lee of criminal misappropriation of CPF funds. In July 2014, Lee applied for summary judgment for the case. In a 4 August affidavit, Ngerng argued that his blog post had been misunderstood, and that he was merely asking for more transparency and accountability for CPF monies. At a 19 September closed hearing, Lee's lawyers asserted that Ngerng had "no defence" and asked for an injunction, while Ngerng's lawyer, M Ravi, argued that the blog post was not defamatory if read in its entirety.

On 7 November, the High Court found Ngerng liable of defamation with damages to be assessed, which was the first such ruling in Singapore over a purely online article. The court ruled that there was "no triable defence" and "no doubt that it is defamatory to suggest that the plaintiff is guilty of criminal misappropriation". An injunction against Ngerng was granted, barring him from publishing future similar accusations regarding Lee and the CPF. Ngerng expressed disappointment at the verdict, but maintained that he would "still continue to speak up on the CPF and other issues that concern Singaporeans". On 12 January 2015, the High Court ordered Ngerng to pay Lee S$29,000 for costs of legal fees and related expenses; with damages yet to be settled. After missing the payment deadline twice, Ngerng paid on 6 February after a public spat with his lawyer, M Ravi.

On 12 June, Ngerng's application to be represented by a Queen's Counsel in the damages hearing scheduled for 1 to 3 July 2015 was denied by the High Court and he was ordered to pay costs of S$6,000 to Lee's lawyers from Drew & Napier.

The damages hearing proceeded as scheduled from 1 to 3 July 2015 with Ngerng representing himself and Lee being represented by Singh. Citing a lack of funds, Ngerng represented himself after dismissing his third lawyer in this case – George Hwang of George Hwang LLC. Ngerng's first lawyer in the case, M Ravi, was suspended by the Law Society for mental health reasons. During a hearing, Ngerng broke down in tears while he was being cross-examined by Singh.

The hearing prompted much comment from international press freedom advocacy groups and a legal opinion in favour of minimal damages against defendant from the International Commission of Jurists: "It is humbly submitted that a decision awarding a disproportionately high amount of damages to the plaintiff in this case would cast a chilling effect on freedom of expression in Singapore". The High Court requested both parties to make written submissions on their respective cases by 31 August 2015. No date was given for the court's decision.

On 17 December, the court handed down a judgement ordering Ngerng to pay S$100,000 in general damages and S$50,000 in aggravated damages. Ngerng, through his lawyer Eugene Thuraisingam, proposed to pay the S$150,000 in instalments. Lee granted Ngerng his request on the condition that Ngerng paid the S$30,000 in hearing costs immediately, i.e., by 16 March 2016. Ngerng is expected to repay S$100 a month from 1 April 2016 onwards over five years until 1 April 2021 when instalments are increased to S$1,000 until the full sum has been paid by the year 2033. Lee also rejected Ngerng's request to reimburse part of the damages, i.e., S$36,000. By 16 April 2021, a crowdfunding campaign had raised the S$144,389.14 required to pay the outstanding damages in full.

=== Hong Lim Park protests ===
Ngerng was a speaker at the Return Our CPF protest organised by blogger Han Hui Hui at Hong Lim Park on 7 June 2014. In his speech, he demanded transparency and accountability for CPF monies. Organisers claimed a turnout of 6,000, while international news agencies reported about 2,000. Ngerng also spoke at the second (which drew "hundreds") and third Return Our CPF protests at the same venue on 12 July and 23 August 2014.

On 27 September 2014, during another Return Our CPF protest organised by Han Hui Hui, which took place at Hong Lim Park at the same time as the YMCA Proms @ the Park event, a charity carnival attended by the elderly and disabled, featuring performances by children. Agence France-Presse described Ngerng and Han as having "led a march ... despite having only a permit to stage a rally at a fixed spot". The Straits Times described that Han had led the protesting group in "marching around the park" together with Ngerng, with the group "heckling special needs children and confronting" Minister of State Trade and Industry Teo Ser Luck, who attended the YMCA event. A few days later, Teo confirmed that Ngerng had issued an apology for the disruption; Teo himself apologised due to his "presence" causing the protesters to "go after" him.

In a joint statement, the National Parks Board (NParks) and the Singapore Police Force (SPF) said that "each event was allocated a lawn" and that Han did not heed their advice "to speak at the allocated space". They described that "Han's group encroached into the YMCA event area, holding placards and shouting slogans, disrupted performances and frightened participants, including special needs children who were performing at the charity event". NParks and SPF also said that final approval to hold the event was given to YMCA on 9 September 2014, while Han's application for the protest was received and approved on 22 September 2014. The YMCA stated that NParks on 11 April 2014 had acknowledged their intent to hold the carnival.

On 27 October 2014, in relation to the YMCA event disruption, Ngerng, Han, and four others were charged for public nuisance, which can incur a maximum fine of S$1,000; Ngerng and Han were also charged for organising a demonstration without approval, which can incur a maximum fine of S$5,000. In October 2015, Ngerng pleaded guilty to charges of public nuisance and organising a demonstration without approval. His lawyer, Eugene Thuraisingam, said he committed the offence because of ignorance. Ngerng was fined S$1,900.

== Personal life ==
Ngerng is gay, as stated in his personal blog, My Right To Love, in 2011. He has written on topics related to the LGBTQ community, such as relationship woes and AIDS. Ngerng's family has long accepted his homosexuality even though they did not react positively when first revealed of his sexual orientation decades ago; his mother initially cried and for a few years refused to acknowledge his homosexuality.

Ngerng has been residing in Taipei since October 2016.
