= Yong Vui Kong =

Convicted drug trafficker sentenced to life imprisonment in Singapore

- Born: 23 January 1988 (age 38); Sandakan, Sabah, Malaysia
- Status: Imprisoned at Changi Prison since 12 June 2007
- Criminal charge: Drug trafficking
- Penalty: Life imprisonment (x3) and 15 strokes of the cane

Yong Vui Kong (Chinese: 杨伟光; pinyin: Yáng Weǐguāng; born 23 January 1988) is a Malaysian who was sentenced to death in Singapore for trafficking more than 15 grams of heroin in 2007. His sentence was reduced to life imprisonment and caning as a result of Singapore's amendments to the Misuse of Drugs Act.

== Personal life ==
Yong is from the state of Sabah, Malaysia. He was a younger sibling to two brothers, Yun Leong and Yun Chung, and has four more siblings. He was working as a "runner" (meaning courier or mule) for an unidentified criminal boss, when he was arrested on 12 June 2007 with 47.27 grams (1.667 oz) of heroin. He was 19 years old at the time, and thus not an adult (the age of majority in Singapore is 21 years). He is also said to be ignorant of the death penalty for smuggling drugs or that the package he was carrying contained drugs. The criminal boss of Yong's, Chia Choon Leng, was subsequently arrested and charged for drug trafficking, but given a discharge not amounting to an acquittal and sentenced to indefinite detention.

Yong was originally represented in the High Court by lawyer Kelvin Lim. Due to Yong's young age, and since execution is mandatory for a person convicted of trafficking in more than 15 grams (0.53 oz) of diamorphine, the trial judge Justice Choo Han Teck asked the prosecution to consider reducing the charge against him. The prosecution declined, and Yong was found guilty and sentenced to death. Through his then lawyer, Yong filed an appeal against the conviction and sentence, but withdrew it on 29 April 2009, the day of the appeal hearing. He then petitioned to President S. R. Nathan for clemency on 11 August 2009, but this was declined on 20 November 2009.

On 2 December 2009, two days before the scheduled date of Yong's execution, human rights lawyer M. Ravi took over Yong's case and obtained a stay of execution before the High Court until the Court of Appeal could hear the application to restore Yong's appeal for hearing. On 8 December 2009, the Court of Appeal, consisting of Chief Justice Chan Sek Keong, Judges of Appeal Andrew Phang and V. K. Rajah, restored Yong's appeal for hearing. The court accepted Ravi's argument that Yong had withdrawn the appeal on the mistaken belief that he could not re-argue the unconstitutionality of the death penalty, in light of past court decisions such as the case of Van Tuong Nguyen. The three judges then proceeded to hear the appeal on 15 March 2010, and on 14 May 2010, they ruled in Yong Vui Kong v. Public Prosecutor that the mandatory death penalty imposed by the Misuse of Drugs Act did not infringe Articles 9(1) and 12(1) of the Singapore Constitution.

Before the Court of Appeal delivered its judgment, Minister of Law K Shanmugam commented on the mandatory death penalty at a community event and cited Yong's case as an example. Ravi filed an application in the High Court for leave to challenge the clemency process by way of judicial review. The application was dismissed and M. Ravi went before the same three judges, who heard Yong's appeal, in the appeal against the leave application. On 4 April 2011, the Court of Appeal dismissed the appeal against that judgment. It affirmed the High Court's view that the President did not possess any personal discretion when exercising the clemency power, and was required to act in accordance with Cabinet's advice on the matter. The conclusion was evident from the wording of Article 22P(1) of the Constitution, the legislative history of the clemency power in Singapore, relevant case law, and the nature of the President's power in the Constitution.

Subsequently, Ravi applied before those three judges in the Court of Appeal once more to re-open its decision on Yong's appeal in March 2012, alleging that Yong had been discriminated when the Attorney-General, in his capacity as the Public Prosecutor, decided to charge Yong for capital offences while applying for discharges not amounting to acquittals for the mastermind behind Yong. The new argument was based on a recent judgment in January that year where the three judges ruled against another drug trafficker represented by M. Ravi, that while the prosecutorial discretion is subjected to judicial review, the applicant failed to produce evidence that the Public Prosecutor took into account irrelevant considerations or was biased in his decision. The application was also dismissed on 4 April 2012.

In July 2012, the Singapore government agreed to ratify changes to the mandatory death sentence for drug trafficking and murder offences – those on death row at that point of time may apply to have their death sentences reduced to life imprisonment. For those convicted of drug trafficking, they would be sentenced to imprisonment for life with/without caning, provided that they were only acting as couriers, were suffering from impaired mental responsibility (e.g. depression), substantively assist the authorities in tackling drug trafficking activities, or any other conditions. For drug traffickers who were not condemned to death but to life-long incarceration with caning, they should receive no less than 15 strokes of the cane. Yong was certified to have fulfilled the role of courier and had substantively assisted the authorities in the fight against drugs.

On 14 November 2013, Yong's death penalty was lifted. He has become the first drug trafficker on death row to have his sentence reduced to life imprisonment (Note: By order of the landmark appeal ruling of Abdul Nasir bin Amer Hamsah's case on 20 August 1997, life imprisonment in Singapore would mean a sentence of imprisonment for the rest of the convict's natural life, with a possible chance of release on parole after the expiration of at least 20 years of the sentence, which is applicable for crimes committed after 20 August 1997.) and caning (15 strokes), under amendments made to the Misuse of Drugs Act. The sentence was backdated to the time when Yong was first charged. Yong was reportedly relieved when he was re-sentenced to life and caning, and so did his family from Sabah. On 22 August 2014, M. Ravi appealed against the new sentence, this time before Chief Justice Sundaresh Menon, Judge of Appeal Andrew Phang and Justice Tay Yong Kwang, that the caning imposed on Yong is unconstitutional. The appeal was dismissed on 4 March 2015.

Yong will spend the rest of his natural life in jail but has a chance for release on parole upon the authorities' review of his conduct after he serves at least 20 years in prison, including time spent in remand and during the original sentence. The parole hearing will occur in June 2027. Yong, who devoted himself to Buddhism in prison and learned to speak English, hoped he could counsel youth on the dangers of drugs during his period of imprisonment.

In March 2026, a month after his retirement from the Bench, Justice Choo Han Teck spoke about the case of Yong in an interview, and he stated that he was personally saddened by the prospect of sentencing Yong to death, because he sympathize with him for his poor parents and life of poverty, and believed that Yong, being a "intelligent, hardworking" person, could become a good and useful citizen if he was rehabilitated. Justice Choo also stated that he was happy for Yong when his death sentence was commuted.

== See also ==
- Capital punishment in Singapore
- Life imprisonment in Singapore
- Kho Jabing
- Nagaenthran K. Dharmalingam
- Van Tuong Nguyen
- Pannir Selvam Pranthaman
- Yong Vui Kong v Public Prosecutor
- Cheong Chun Yin
- Caning in Singapore
- Abdul Kahar Othman
