= Shanmugam Murugesu =

Singaporean drug trafficker (died 2005)

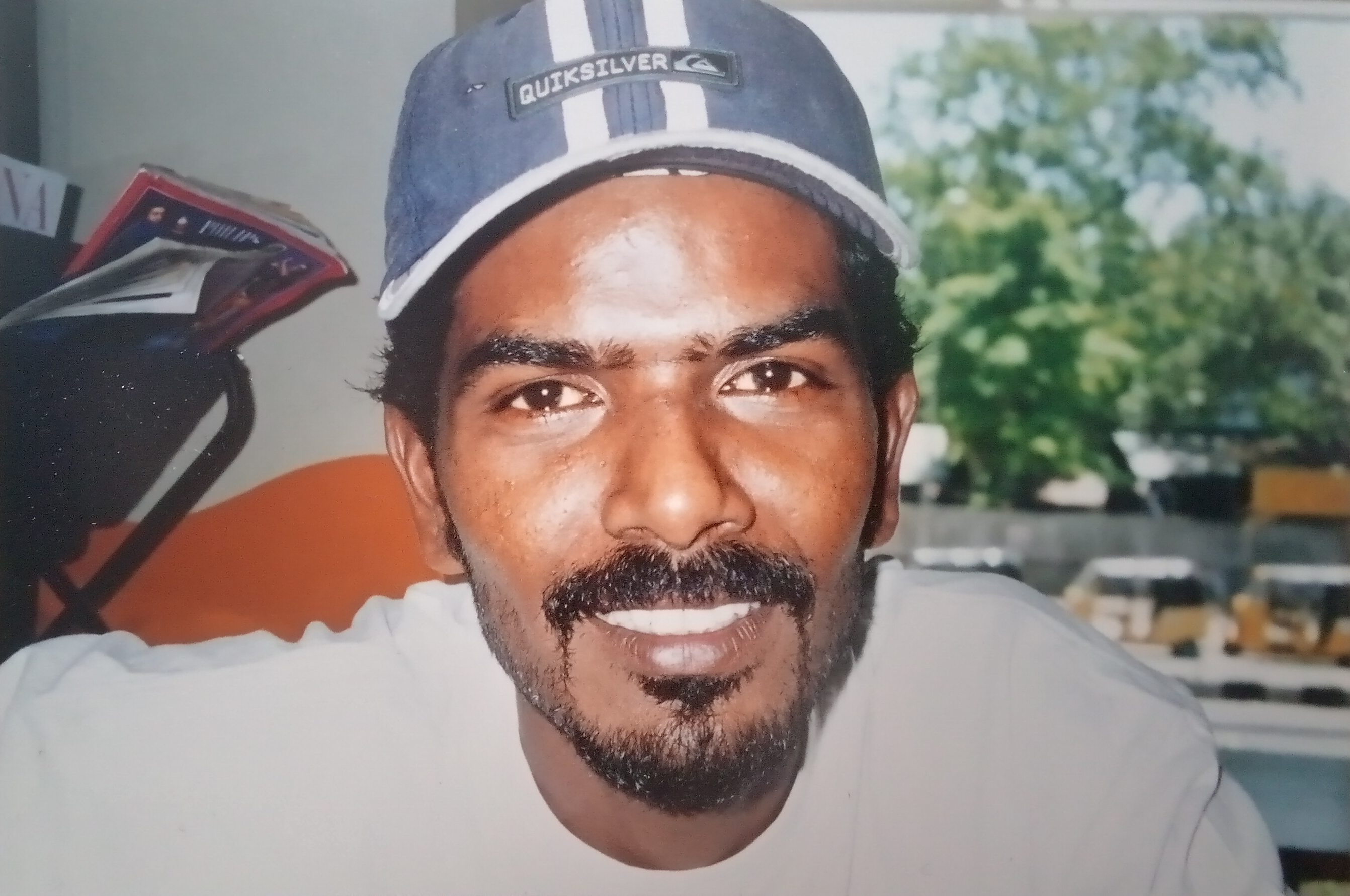
- Born: c. 1967
- Died: 13 May 2005; Changi Prison, Singapore
- Status: Executed by hanging
- Criminal charges: Drug trafficking
- Penalty: Death

Shanmugam "Sam" Murugesu (Tamil: சண்முகம் முருகேசு) (c.1967 – 13 May 2005) was a Singaporean jet skier and convicted drug trafficker. In 2005, he was executed for bringing cannabis into Singapore from Malaysia.

== Biography ==
As a young man, he served in the Singaporean Army for 8 years, until a tank accident cost him his position. He then turned to a passion for water sports, and was a jet ski world champion. He went on to represent Singapore at the 1995 IJSBA World Finals in Lake Havasu City, USA. His leg was broken when his jet ski was rammed by another competitor, and his desire to support his extended family took precedence over racing. He also suffered a severe hand injury while working as a mechanic. His love of the ocean led him to teach sailing and work for the Singapore Sports Council for four years. He also worked as a taxi driver and window cleaner.

In 2003, Shanmugam was arrested while crossing the Singapore/Malaysia border with 1.03 kg (2.2 lbs) of cannabis. Shanmugam was represented by M Ravi during his trial. He was sentenced to death on 29 April 2004. A clemency plea to the president of Singapore, S R Nathan, was rejected. A last-minute application to delay Shanmugam's execution was rejected by the High Court.

On 13 May 2005, Shanmugam was hanged. His death inspired artistic director Benny Lim to put on a one-man experimental play, Humans Lefts, to discuss the social issue of the death penalty.

== Personal life ==
Shanmugam was divorced and had two twin sons.

== See also ==
- Capital punishment in Singapore
