= Choo Han Teck =

Singaporean judge of the Supreme Court

The Honourable Choo Han Teck
- 朱汉德 / 朱漢德

Judge of the Supreme Court of Singapore
- In office 2 January 2003 – 20 February 2006
- Appointed by: S. R. Nathan; Halimah Yacob (2019, 2021, 2022, 2024)

Judicial Commissioner of Singapore
- In office 1 April 1995 – 2 January 2003
- Appointed by: Ong Teng Cheong

Personal details
- Born: 20 February 1954 (age 72) Singapore
- Education: National University of Singapore; University of Cambridge

Choo Han Teck
- Traditional Chinese: 朱漢德
- Simplified Chinese: 朱汉德
Transcriptions
Standard Mandarin
- Hanyu Pinyin: Zhū Hàn Dé

Choo Han Teck (born 20 February 1954) was a Singaporean judge of the Supreme Court from 2003 to 2026. He was formerly a lawyer before his appointment to the court as a judge. It was revealed in 2021 that Choo was one of the defence lawyers representing Adrian Lim, the infamous Toa Payoh child killer who was executed in 1988 for charges of murdering a girl and boy as ritual sacrifices. In 1994, Choo also defended Phua Soy Boon, a jobless Singaporean who was hanged in 1995 for killing a moneylender.

Choo was first appointed Judicial Commissioner in 1995, and later appointed High Court Judge in January 2003. He has been re-appointed thrice as Judge of the High Court since his retirement and will continue to serve in this capacity till 20 February 2026. Choo was appointed President of the Military Court of Appeal of the Singapore Armed Forces in November 2004. He is said to be one of the more senior judges in the Court presiding over matrimonial matters, and "has played an important role" in that area.

== Early life and education ==
He was born to a ship chandler and housewife. He earned his Bachelor of Laws from the University of Singapore in 1979, which was renamed the National University of Singapore a year later, before getting a Master of Laws from the University of Cambridge in 1986.

Choo was an opponent of capital punishment in Singapore.

== Past court cases heard by Choo ==
=== Murder of Ching Bee Ing ===
Choo Han Teck, who then became Judicial Commissioner, presided the trial of Teo Kim Hong, a prostitute charged with stabbing her co-worker Ching Bee Ing to death in August 1995. After hearing the case for five days in January 1996, Choo found that Teo had intentionally stabbed Ching seven times, such that four of these injuries penetrated her heart and liver and sufficient to cause death in the ordinary course of nature. Choo therefore found Teo guilty of murder and sentenced her to death. Teo lost her appeal and she was hanged on 30 August 1996.

=== Oriental Hotel murder ===
Choo heard the case of Abdul Nasir Amer Hamsah, who was accused of murdering a Japanese tourist named Fujii Isae during a robbery. Abdul Nasir committed the crime in 1994 with his friend Abdul Rahman Arshad at Oriental Hotel, where they were initially finding a job before deciding to rob two female members of a Japanese tour group. Both women, Fujii and her friend Takishita Miyoko, were assaulted before Fujii was accidentally stepped onto the face by Abdul Nasir, who lost his balance and fell during his escape from the hotel room, which left behind fatal facial bone fractures that caused suffocation leading to death. Abdul Nasir was only caught two years later and stood trial for murder in 1996, while Abdul Rahman, who was eventually found to be in prison for another crime, had ten more years added to his then 20-month sentence, as well as caning of 16 strokes for robbing the tourists.

Despite the prosecution's argument that Abdul Nasir intentionally stamped onto the tourist's face to kill her, Choo Han Teck accepted Abdul Nasir's defence that he accidentally stepped onto Fujii's face, as the physically big-sized Abdul Nasir's height of 1.8 m and weight of 76 kg, compared to Fujii Isae's height of 1.5 m and weight of 51 kg, made it possible for an accidental step being the causation of the injuries on the victim's face. Abdul Nasir was sentenced to 18 years' imprisonment and 18 strokes of the cane for a lesser charge of robbery with hurt resulting in death. Choo's decision to acquit Abdul Nasir of murder was later affirmed by the Court of Appeal. In the aftermath, Abdul Nasir received an additional life sentence with caning of 12 strokes in a separate trial for an unrelated crime of kidnapping two police officers for ransom.

=== Geylang beer bottle murder ===
In May 1998, a 40-year-old Sikh prison warden named Jaranjeet Singh was attacked by two Indian men at a coffee shop in Geylang, and one of the attackers smashed a beer bottle and fatally slashed Jaranjeet's throat with the broken glass, causing Jaranjeet to bleed to death. 38-year-old S Nagarajan Kuppusamy, the man who directly killed Jaranjeet, was charged with murder and stood trial before Judicial Commissioner Choo Han Teck in October 1998.

During the same month of Nagarajan's trial, Choo judged that Nagarajan had violently murdered Jaranjeet over a minor dispute and described the attack as an "outright assault against a defenceless man". He also judged that Nagarajan had intentionally cut Jaranjeet's throat with the broken beer bottle, such that the injury deliberately caused was sufficient to cause death in the ordinary course of nature. Therefore, Choo found Nagarajan guilty of murder and sentenced the former lorry driver to death. Nagarajan was hanged on 23 July 1999 after his appeal against Choo's verdict was rejected.

Nagarajan's accomplice, 38-year-old Saminathan Subramaniam was found guilty of a lesser offence of causing hurt with a dangerous weapon and sentenced to nine months' imprisonment and six strokes of the cane in a separate trial.

=== T Maniam murder case ===
In December 1999, JC Choo Han Teck was set to hear the cases of three people, who were alleged to be the conspirators of a former police officer's murder. The three people were Julaiha Begum, Loganatha Venkatesan and Chandran Rajagopal. Julaiha was alleged to be the mastermind of the plot to murder her estranged husband T Maniam over property disputes. Venkatesan and Chandran were the ones who took charge of beating Maniam to death outside his house in Phoenix Garden, and they successfully done so five months before their trial. In fact, there was a fourth person named Govindasamy Ravichandran, who was roped in to kill Maniam but he declined to continue proceeding with the plan and left the group. Ravichandran was the sole witness in the trial against the trio, and his testimony was met with strong denials by the three whose lawyers tried to discredit Ravichandran's testimony.

It was on 14 March 2000 when Choo made a final judgement. Choo found that Ravichandran was a credible and truthful witness despite the situation being solely his own word against all three, because Ravichandran was speaking with “the assuredness that comes only from a person who has been where he said he has been, and done what he said he has done”, and he gave a very detailed and complete account, and he was able to recall even the most minor details, which were supported by other minor witnesses and other objective evidence. He also rejected the defences of the three suspects as both Venkatesan and Chandran were being recognised and seen at the scene of crime by three witnesses, which made them unable to pinpoint their hired driver "Mani" (who knew about the murder plot and drove them to where Maniam lived prior to his murder) as the one who killed Maniam or claim that they came to visit Maniam for other purposes, and also the clear evidence of Julaiha's motive to murder her husband.

For this, the three were convicted of murder and sentenced to be executed in Changi Prison, which they did on 16 February 2001 after the trio exhausted all their respective avenues of appeal against the death sentence.

=== Death and abuse of Indonesian maid Muawanatul Chasanah ===
In December 2001, a 19-year-old Indonesian maid named Muawanatul Chasanah was found dead in her employer's flat after she endured starvation and physical abuse, which caused her to die from peritonitis due to a ruptured stomach. Her employer, 47-year-old tour guide Ng Hua Chye, was responsible for her abuse and death, and he was arrested for murder after he surrendered at a police station and confessed to both abusing and killing his maid. The case was then known to be one of the worst cases of maid abuse in Singapore.

Ng was later convicted of five charges of culpable homicide and maid abuse, after the prosecution reduced the murder charge against Ng on the request of Ng's lawyer Subhas Anandan. JC Choo Han Teck, who heard the case in July 2002, noted during the sentencing phase that some of the old scars and injuries found on Chasanah were not attributed to the cruelty of her employer. In his own words, however, Choo stated, 'There is little by way of mitigation that merits a lenient sentence.', as he cited the 200 extensive injuries found on Chasanah, which implied the brutality of Ng in abusing his maid should warrant a harsh penalty by the courts. Choo then sentenced Ng Hua Chye to a total of 18 years and six months' imprisonment and 12 strokes of the cane, which was reported to be the longest penalty ever given to a convicted maid abuser in Singapore back then.

=== Killing of footballer Sulaiman Hashim ===
On 31 May 2001, 17-year-old national football player Sulaiman bin Hashim and his two friends were attacked by a group of eight youths from gang 369, known as Salakau, as they were walking along South Bridge Road, Clarke Quay. Sulaiman was grievously assaulted by the gang while his two friends managed to escape. During the assault, Sulaiman sustained 13 stab wounds and two of them were fatal; he died as a result. Two members of the gang escaped from Singapore and were never caught as of today, while the remaining six were arrested within the next thirteen months in various parts of Singapore, and also in both Malaysia and Indonesia.

Of all of these six members, four of them were charged with murder, and the remaining two were jailed for rioting. Among the four murder accused, two of them later pleaded guilty to culpable homicide and served a life sentence and ten-year jail term respectively. The remaining two, 20-year-old Fazely Rahmat and 19-year-old Khairul Famy Mohamed Samsudin pleaded not guilty and were tried for murder by Choo Han Teck, who remained as Judicial Commissioner in May 2002.

Two months into the trial, Choo decided to acquit Fazely and Khairul of murder, as he found insufficient evidence to prove the two youths guilty of murder since they were not the principal offenders responsible for the fatal knife wounds found on Sulaiman. Despite their common intention in assaulting Sulaiman, JC Choo stated that the pair were not aware that their other members are armed or even if the boys carried on assaulting the victim after he was stabbed, that they had the intention to cause death or cause grievous hurt with dangerous weapons. From this, Choo sentenced both Fazely and Khairul to the maximum of 5 years' imprisonment and 12 strokes of the cane each for reduced charges of rioting. In his verdict, Choo cited the seriousness of the crime as he passed :

In cases such as this where a young and innocent life is senselessly slain, the retribution of the law must be inflicted swiftly and firmly but, appropriately, as against the diverse offenders and the diverse nature of their crime.

Later, the prosecution tried to appeal for the boys to be convicted of murder; the Court of Appeal rejected the appeals, and instead increased the duo's jail terms to seven years after finding them guilty of a more serious offence of voluntarily causing grievous hurt.

=== 2002 Orchard Towers murders ===
Choo, who was promoted to a High Court judge before 2006, was the judge who received the task of hearing the case and sentencing of Michael McCrea, a British fugitive who was wanted for the murders of a couple, whose bodies were found abandoned in a car at Orchard Towers in January 2002. McCrea had apparently killed his friend, Kho Nai Guan, during a provoked fight (due to Kho's offensive remark on McCrea's girlfriend) and had also caused the death of Lan Ya Ming, Kho's girlfriend in the aftermath of the fight before he and his girlfriend, Audrey Ong Pei Ling, who helped him dispose of the victims' bodies, escaped to London and later Australia, where they were caught by the Australian police. Ong and McCrea were sent back to Singapore for trial in November 2002 and September 2005 respectively; the latter's extradition was approved on Singapore's assurance to Australia that they would not execute McCrea for murder. Ong later spent 12 years in prison since early 2003 for helping McCrea to remove the evidence of the couple's murders.

Choo sentenced McCrea to a total of 24 years' imprisonment, after the killer pleaded guilty to two charges of culpable homicide and a third charge of destroying evidence of a homicide case. Choo made it clear he did not buy McCrea's plea for a lighter sentence because he was remorseful, as he had assaulted and killed Kho during the fight over a small matter, and had killed Lan just to find the $20,000 bonus he paid Kho a month prior in order to remove evidence of their deaths. McCrea's appeal to reduce his sentence was later rejected by the Court of Appeal.

=== Yong Vui Kong ===
In 2007, Choo sentenced 19-year-old Malaysian and drug trafficker Yong Vui Kong to death after convicting him of illegally bringing more than 40 g of heroin. Yong was possibly the youngest person to be sentenced to execution for drug trafficking at the time of his trial. Despite Yong's multiple appeals and constitutionality challenge of his death sentence, Choo's decision to sentence Yong to death was repeatedly affirmed by the Court of Appeal of Singapore.

In January 2013, the Singapore government changed its laws to remove the mandatory death penalty for drug traffickers who merely acted as couriers, or had mental illnesses at the time of their offences. Yong was qualified for re-sentencing since he was a courier in his case, and after his case was sent back to the original trial judge Choo Han Teck for review, Yong's death sentence was commuted to life imprisonment and 15 strokes of the cane in November 2013.

=== Cheong Chun Yin and Pang Siew Fum ===
On 16 June 2008, Cheong Chun Yin, a 24-year-old Malaysian, and his accomplice Pang Siew Fum were both arrested for the trafficking of 2,726g of heroin into Singapore from Myanmar, and both of them were found guilty and sentenced to death by hanging in 2010 by Choo Han Teck, who found that the duo had indeed have the intention to traffic the drugs and although they tried to say they believed they were carrying valuables and not drugs, Choo stated it was not to be believed as they did not make steps to ensure if they were carrying drugs and had not reported to their bosses that their intended items were not in the bags, which would have meant that they knew they carried drugs and hence they should face the gallows.

In January 2013, the Singapore government changed its laws to remove the mandatory death penalty for drug traffickers who merely acted as couriers, or had mental illnesses at the time of their offences. Cheong was qualified for re-sentencing since he was a courier in his case, and after his case was sent back to the original trial judge Choo Han Teck for review, Cheong's death sentence was commuted to life imprisonment and 15 strokes of the cane in April 2015. On the same date of Cheong's reprieve, Pang was also placed under life imprisonment as a result of a mental illness despite failing to meet the criteria of a drug courier.

=== 2010 Kallang slashing ===
In 2013, Justice Choo Han Teck took charge of presiding the trial of Micheal Garing and Tony Imba, two members of a gang of four who were charged with the murder of one of their four robbery victims Shanmuganathan Dillidurai, who was robbed and killed in Kallang in 2010. The other two members Hairee Landak and Donny Meluda were each sentenced to 33 years' imprisonment and 24 strokes of the cane for multiple charges of armed robbery with hurt in 2013 and 2018 respectively.

Choo found both Micheal and Tony guilty of murder in January 2014. A year later, despite the prosecution's arguments for the death penalty for both men, only Micheal Garing was sentenced to death while Tony Imba, on the other hand, was sentenced to life imprisonment and 24 strokes of the cane. By then, Singapore has reformed its laws and introduced life imprisonment with caning as a minimum sentence for certain offences of murder with no intention to kill. Choo stated in his verdict that Micheal was the only person of the pair to have directly used the parang to attack and slash Shanmuganathan to death, and he demonstrated a streak of brutality and violence that convinced Choo to conclude that his conduct deserved the maximum penalty of death. Tony, however, was not the one who struck Shanmuganathan with the parang and he played a secondary role in causing Shanmuganathan's death, hence he did not deserve the same sentence as Micheal.

Micheal later appealed against his death sentence while the prosecution pressed for Tony to receive the death penalty too; the Court of Appeal turned down both appeals in February 2017. Micheal was hanged on 22 March 2019, after he failed to obtain clemency from the President of Singapore.

=== 2014 Little India legless body case ===
In June 2014, the legless body of 59-year-old Pakistani national Muhammad Noor was found inside an abandoned luggage placed alongside the road. After the grisly discovery was reported to the police, Muhammad's two roommates and tissue paper sellers Rasheed Muhammad and Ramzan Rizwan, both of whom also came from Pakistan, were arrested and charged with Muhammad's murder. The severed legs of the victim were later discovered at a Muslim cemetery.

Justice Choo, the trial judge who heard the cases of the pair, found that both men had intentionally smothered Muhammad to death in order to steal his money after they lost their cash to him in a game of cards. He stated that the murder was clearly the work of two persons, and he rejected that only one of them was responsible for killing Muhammad and butchering his body. He rejected Rasheed's claim of him being threatened by Ramzan, who was 18 years younger than him, into helping commit the murder, and also rejected Ramzan's claim that he ran out of the room while Rasheed attacked Muhammad and smothered him to death. Therefore, Justice Choo found both men guilty of murder and sentenced them to death on 17 February 2017.

=== Dexmon Chua murder case ===
On 17 January 2017, Justice Choo Han Teck found 57-year-old Chia Kee Chen guilty of murder in the kidnapping and fatal assault of 37-year-old Dexmon Chua Yizhi, who was his wife's ex-lover. He stated that Chia kidnapped Chua out of revenge for the affair and he had grievously assaulted the man with the help of his Indonesian friend Febri Irwansyah Djatmiko inside their borrowed van on that fateful day of 28 December 2013. Febri fled Singapore and was never caught, while the killers' hired driver Chua Leong Aik was sent to jail for five years for helping to kidnap and assault the victim. However, Justice Choo ruled that it was not clear if he, or his accomplices, had dealt the fatal blows, hence he sentenced Chia to life imprisonment despite the prosecution's arguments for a death sentence.

A year later, after the prosecution appealed, the Court of Appeal affirmed Choo's decision to convict Chia of murder, but they sentenced Chia to death since he premeditated the plot and the murder was committed in a merciless and violent manner, as well as Chia exhibiting a blatant disregard for human life during the fatal assault.

== Personal life ==
He and his wife have two children, a son and daughter.
