= Roslan Bakar and Pausi Jefridin =

Drug trafficking duo hanged in Singapore for smuggling diamorphine

Roslan Bakar
- Born: Roslan bin Bakar; 1971; Singapore
- Died: 15 November 2024 (aged 53); Changi Prison, Singapore
- Cause of death: Execution by hanging
- Status: Executed
- Conviction: Drug trafficking
- Criminal charge: Trafficking of 96.07g of diamorphine
- Penalty: Death penalty

Details
- Imprisoned at: Changi Prison

Pausi Jefridin
- Born: Pausi bin Jefridin; 1985; Sabah, Malaysia
- Died: 15 November 2024 (aged 39); Changi Prison, Singapore
- Cause of death: Execution by hanging
- Status: Executed
- Conviction: Drug trafficking
- Criminal charge: Trafficking of 96.07g of diamorphine
- Penalty: Death penalty

Details
- Imprisoned at: Changi Prison

Roslan Bakar (1971 – 15 November 2024) and Pausi Jefridin (1985 – 15 November 2024) were a pair of drug traffickers convicted and sentenced to death for a joint 2008 drug trafficking case. Roslan, a Singaporean, and Pausi, a Malaysian from Sabah, were both charged for the trafficking of 96.07g of diamorphine (pure heroin), and tried together in the same trial for the offence, before they were given the death penalty on 22 April 2010.

A controversial point of the men's cases were that the pair had low IQ, and human rights activists urged the government of Singapore to commute their death sentences to life imprisonment on account of intellectual disability. Roslan was reportedly diagnosed with borderline intelligence while Pausi had an IQ of 67. However, the courts of Singapore had rejected the men's appeals to be re-sentenced and upheld that the men did not have an abnormality of the mind and were well aware of the magnitude of their crimes.

Both Roslan and Pausi were originally scheduled to hang on 16 February 2022, but their executions were temporarily stayed due to an appeal, and two years later, both men were hanged in Changi Prison on 15 November 2024.

== Arrests and drug trafficking trial ==
On 14 June 2008, 23-year-old Pausi Jefridin, a Malaysian national from Sabah, was arrested by the Central Narcotics Bureau (CNB) at a public car park in Choa Chu Kang, after he was completing a drug transaction under the secret surveillance of the CNB officers. A total of 96.07g of diamorphine (pure heroin) were recovered by the police, and the amount of drugs seized was more than six times the minimum amount that mandated the death sentence under the Misuse of Drugs Act. Another three suspects were also caught for the same offence.

During the investigations, the police uncovered that the drug transaction was masterminded by a Singaporean named Roslan Bakar, and on 18 July 2008, 37-year-old Roslan was arrested at his stepbrother's flat in Teban Gardens, therefore becoming the fifth and final person in the case to be charged. At the end of investigations, Roslan and Pausi were both confirmed to stand trial, while the remaining three suspects – Mohamed Zamri Mohamed Sopri, Nuradaha Putra Nordin and Norzainy Zainal – became prosecution witnesses against the pair.

The two men stood trial at the High Court for one count of trafficking 96.07g of diamorphine and one count of trafficking 76.37g of methamphetamine. The prosecution charged that both men were involved in the drug smuggling operation and based on their case, Roslan and the three witnesses met up at a coffee shop in Lengkok Bahru and he directed the others to conduct a drug transaction, which took place in Choa Chu Kang and Pausi was present at the location to facilitate the transportation of drugs. In their defences, Pausi did not deny he was present at the scene but stated he was there to collect money from Roslan under the request of someone named "Bobby" and was unaware of the drug transaction, while Roslan totally denied his involvement in the crime, adding that he was at another place in Singapore and never gone to Lengkok Bahru or Choa Chu Kang when the offence was committed. Roslan claimed on the Saturday morning of 14 June 2008 (the same date of his crime), he was at his mother Medah Dollah's house in the morning and after lunch, Roslan met his stepbrother Shamsubari Jaafar at the Turf Club at Pasir Panjang, where Roslan stayed until 7pm, and met his nephew Muhammad Abu Hassan at the MacDonald’s restaurant at West Coast for an hour at 9pm, before he went back to his mother's flat for the day.

On 22 April 2010, after a trial lasting 15 days, Justice Choo Han Teck delivered his verdict. Justice Choo found that Pausi's defence was weak and too vague, and his story was unconvincing enough to downplay the strength of the prosecution's case. Justice Choo also rejected Roslan's alibi defence, noting that while Roslan's mother indeed had a routine of cooking lunch for her son on Saturday afternoons (including 14 June 2008), Roslan's mother could not recall clearly if her son was at home before lunch and the testimony of Roslan's stepbrother did not satisfactorily corroborate Roslan's alibi, and hence, he rejected Roslan's alibi defence, and further dismissed Roslan's allegations that the CNB officers used excessive force on him when he was arrested. Justice Choo additionally noted that Roslan testified in court that he never knew Pausi and they only met for the first time after his arrest, which was contradicted by Pausi's assertion that he met Roslan before for the payment pertaining to drugs, and accepted Pausi's evidence on this part.

For these above reasons, Justice Choo concluded there were sufficient grounds to convict the duo of drug trafficking. As a result, both 39-year-old Roslan Bakar and 25-year-old Pausi Jefridin were found guilty of capital drug trafficking and sentenced to death by hanging.

== Appeal processes ==
=== Direct appeal and re-trial petitions ===
After they were sentenced to hang, both Roslan Bakar and Pausi Jefridin filed a direct appeal to the Court of Appeal. On 17 March 2011, the Court of Appeal dismissed the appeals of the two men.

Roslan later filed a petition for a re-trial and sought to introduce new evidence to prove that he was being framed by other suspects as part of a conspiracy. However, this appeal was rejected on 30 November 2015.

=== Re-sentencing plea ===
A year after the first appeals of both Roslan and Pausi were rejected, Singapore decided to amend its death penalty laws in July 2012, imposing a moratorium on all 35 executions in the country, including Rosman's. The changes, which took effect in January 2013, gave judges the discretion to sentence drug traffickers to life imprisonment with a minimum of 15 strokes of the cane instead of the death penalty, provided they were only couriers. This option was available if the offender had received a certificate of substantive assistance from the public prosecutor for helping the narcotics police disrupt drug trafficking. Additionally, life imprisonment could be imposed if the offender was found to have diminished responsibility due to a mental illness that severely impaired their mental faculties, in which case the death penalty and caning would not apply.

In 2016, after failing to secure a re-trial, Roslan, together with his co-accused Pausi, filed appeals for re-sentencing by the High Court. The pair's main ground of appeal was diminished responsibility. Both men had claimed to be suffering from an abnormality of mind, as a result of their low intelligence and it amounted to intellectual disability. Pausi's lawyer Chung Ting Fai submitted that Puais was diagnosed with an IQ level of 67, and the psychiatric reports showed that he was unable to "think through his actions and consequences thoroughly". Roslan's lawyer Kertar Singh also argued that Roslan had an IQ of 74 and reduced intellectual functioning and he in turn had "limited capacity for judgement, decision-making, consequential thinking, impulse control and executive function", and further submitted that Roslan was merely a courier an did not instruct anyone to smuggle the diamorphine.

On 13 November 2017, Justice Choo Han Teck, the original trial judge of the two men's trial, rejected their re-sentencing petitions. Justice Choo found that the evidence before the courts did not persuasively show that Roslan and Pausi were suffering from an abnormality of the mind when the offence was committed, and they were able to comprehend the full magnitude of their actions. Justice Choo also noted that while Pausi may have acted as a courier in this crime, Roslan played a more central role in the drug transaction and "directed the actions of others involved, and orchestrated its moving parts".

In an unpublished decision in 2018, the Court of Appeal similarly rejected the re-sentencing pleas and upheld the death sentences of Roslan and Pausi after agreeing with the decision of Justice Choo.

=== Civil lawsuit in 2021 ===
One of the men, Roslan, was also involved in a separate lawsuit related to allegations that private letters between death row inmates and their lawyers or families were being sent from prisons to the Attorney-General's Chambers (AGC). As a result, the inmates took legal action against the AGC and its officials, accusing them of misconduct, violating their rights, and seeking damages for any harm caused. Roslan, along with 21 other death row inmates (mostly convicted for drug trafficking), was represented by human rights lawyer M. Ravi in an effort to identify those responsible for sending the inmates' correspondence to the AGC. The lawsuit was dismissed on 16 March 2021, and the inmates, including Roslan, were ordered to pay $10 in costs. Later, Roslan, along with 12 other prisoners from the original group of 22 plaintiffs, filed civil suits against the Attorney-General of Singapore over this issue. However, their lawyer, M. Ravi, withdrew the lawsuit in November 2021, and he was required to cover over $10,000 in legal costs associated with the case.

=== Racial discrimination lawsuit ===
In August 2021, Roslan was among 17 Malay death row inmates who appealed their sentences, alleging racial discrimination. They highlighted that between 2010 and 2021, Malays represented 66 out of 120 drug trafficking cases, with over 76% of them resulting in death sentences. Additionally, 50 of the 77 individuals sentenced to death during this period were Malays. Roslan and the others argued that racial bias influenced the prosecution of capital cases, pointing to the disproportionate number of Malays on Singapore's death row. However, on 2 December 2021, the courts dismissed the appeal, stating there was no evidence of racial discrimination in the treatment of the inmates. The allegations were considered an abuse of the court system, as they could damage the integrity and reputation of Singapore's legal system. The two lawyers representing the inmates, Cheng Kim Kuan and M. Ravi, were also ordered to pay S$10,000 in costs for bringing the case.

== 2022 execution attempts and respite ==
About 12 years after they were first arrested, Roslan Bakar and Pausi Jefridin had their execution dates set, and in their death warrants, the two men were scheduled to hang on 16 February 2022. A third prisoner, drug trafficker Rosman Abdullah, was also scheduled to hang the following week on 23 February 2022.

The scheduling of the executions for Roslan and Pausi sparked significant controversy, as both inmates were reportedly diagnosed with low IQ. Anti-death penalty groups argued that the death penalty should not be carried out for them due to their intellectual disabilities. This issue was closely linked to the case of Nagaenthran Dharmalingam, who was also sentenced to death despite his alleged intellectual disability, and in spite of both local and international pleas for clemency. Nagaenthran was eventually hanged on 27 April 2022.

Represented by lawyer and political dissident Charles Yeo, Roslan and Pausi lodged last-minute appeals to delay their executions, and asked for a reopening of their previous appeals that were dismissed. Additionally, Yeo appealed to the High Court in a separate filing and sought to declare that the death sentences of his clients were unconstitutional. However, these applications were rejected by the courts. The Court of Appeal decreed in their full grounds of decision that the law did not bar the judiciary from executing offenders with their IQ being below 70, and noted that both appellants did not suffer from any abnormality of the mind based on the previous rulings of the Court of Appeal and evidence adduced to the courts, and there was essentially no new material in the last-minute appeals filed by the duo.

On 16 February 2022, the same date of the pair's scheduled executions, an interim stay of execution was granted after both Roslan and Pausi sought leave to further appeal for a new judicial review of their cases. A day after, then President of Singapore Halimah Yacob granted both Pausi and Roslan a respite to postpone their executions while pending further appeals. Similarly, the execution of Rosman was also temporarily halted due to an appeal.

After gaining a temporary stay of execution, Rosman, Pausi and Roslan appealed together to the High Court and sought to declare their death sentences unconstitutional. On 16 March 2022, High Court Judge Kannan Ramesh dismissed the appeals of Rosman, Pausi, and Roslan. The judge determined that the trio had presented recycled arguments that had already been rejected in previous proceedings, viewing their actions as an abuse of the court process. The judge further suggested that their appeals were likely a strategic attempt to delay their executions. For their involvement in the cases of both the convicts, Charles Yeo was ordered to pay S$4,000 to the Attorney-General and Public Prosecutor, while a Malaysian civil group Lawyers For Liberty were ordered to pay S$1,000 to the Attorney-General.

Amnesty International, a global human rights organization, condemned the rise in scheduled executions as "appalling" and urged Singapore to impose a moratorium on the death penalty. The European Union (EU) similarly appealed to the Singapore government to halt the execution of Rosman and reiterated its call for the abolition of the death penalty in Singapore. The Anti-Death Penalty Asia Network (ADPAN) also issued a statement, urging Singaporean authorities to spare the lives of the drug traffickers recently scheduled for execution in the city-state.

== Further appeals ==
While their executions were temporarily stayed, both Roslan Bakar and Pausi Jefridin continued to pursue additional appeals in relation to their death sentences, whether individually or together.

=== Lawsuit against Attorney-General ===
On 3 August 2022, Roslan and Pausi were among 24 condemned prisoners who filed a lawsuit against the Attorney-General, claiming that their access to legal counsel had been obstructed, forcing them to argue their appeals without representation. They argued that this resulted in an unfair legal process. However, the High Court dismissed the lawsuit, stating that lawyers had legitimate reasons for refusing to take on death row cases. Furthermore, there was no evidence to suggest that the strict court orders and financial penalties imposed on lawyers for submitting baseless appeals had created widespread fear among lawyers in defending death row inmates. A subsequent appeal related to this lawsuit was also rejected by the Court of Appeal on 4 August 2022. The following day, on 5 August 2022, one of the prisoners, Abdul Rahim Shapiee, was executed, just one day after the lawsuit was lost.

=== Legal challenge against Pacc Act ===
In December 2023, Roslan and Pausi were among 36 death row inmates who filed a legal motion to challenge the newly introduced Post-Appeal Applications in Capital Cases Act (PACC Act). This law was designed to address last-minute appeals from death row prisoners who had exhausted all other legal options. Roslan and the other plaintiffs argued that the law was discriminatory and would strip death row inmates of their final opportunity for justice, potentially resulting in an unfair legal process. However, Justice Hoo Sheau Peng of the High Court dismissed the lawsuit, stating that the law was introduced to address the increasing number of last-minute appeals and the abuse of court processes. The law's intent was to filter out frivolous appeals. Justice Hoo also pointed out that the Act's provisions did not infringe on the legal rights of death row inmates, as it had not yet been enforced. A subsequent appeal by the same 36 plaintiffs was dismissed by the Court of Appeal on 27 March 2024.

=== Civil lawsuit in 2024 ===
Subsequently, Roslan was one of the 13 death row prisoners who filed a civil lawsuit against the Attorney-General's Chambers (AGC) and Singapore Prison Service (SPS). They claimed misconduct related to prison correspondence, alleging that the prison authorities had shared their letters with the AGC. The inmates sought damages for unlawful practices, breach of confidentiality, and copyright infringement.

On 11 October 2024, the Court of Appeal's three judges – Chief Justice Sundaresh Menon, Senior Judge Judith Prakash and Justice Steven Chong – ruled that the AGC and the SPS had unlawfully violated the confidentiality of letters from 13 death row inmates. The judges highlighted the significance of prisoners' rights to confidential correspondence, especially with legal counsel. While SPS and AGC defended their actions by claiming they needed legal advice, the court determined there was no need to share these letters. The court awarded nominal damages for the copyright breach but denied any compensation for the breach of confidence.

== Executions ==
Two years after the first execution attempt of the men, a second death warrant was jointly issued for both Roslan and Pausi on 11 November 2024, re-scheduling them both to hang on the Friday morning of 15 November 2024.

In a final bid to escape the gallows, Roslan appealed to delay his execution once again. Roslan stated that he still had a pending legal motion (which he participated alongside 35 other condemned prisoners) against a death penalty law curbing the post-conviction appeal process of death row inmates, and also filed a complaint against his previous lawyers, for which the complaint was yet to be resolved, and hoped to continue with these proceedings while putting his execution on hold. He also argued that he should be given the usual seven-day notice rather than four days about his execution date.

However, on 14 November 2024, the eve of the double execution, the motion was dismissed by Judge of Appeal Tay Yong Kwang of the Court of Appeal, and Justice Tay stated that there was no inclination for death row inmates to be given a seven-day notice when their executions were re-scheduled after the first stay order, when they already had their executions delayed once and used up the original seven-day notice to sort out their last matters. Justice Tay, who rejected the need to further postpone Roslan's execution, added that these upcoming legal applications did not have a bearing in his conviction or sentence, and stated that the additional two years Roslan received from his stay of execution since 2022 should provide him ample time and opportunity to resolve whatever non-urgent and urgent matters he needed to oversee, and noted that all his avenues of appeal against conviction and sentence were already used up. On the other hand, Pausi did not appeal to stay his execution.

On 15 November 2024, both 53-year-old Roslan Bakar and 39-year-old Pausi Jefridin were hanged at dawn in Changi Prison. The Central Narcotics Bureau (CNB) confirmed in a media statement that both men, who were not named in the source, were hanged and reiterated that Roslan and Pausi were "accorded full due process" and represented by counsel throughout the legal proceedings, and confirmed that the clemency petitions of both men were rejected prior to their hangings. Merely a week later, a third drug trafficker Rosman Abdullah was hanged on 22 November 2024 at the same prison as Pausi and Roslan.

On 26 November 2024, a correction order was issued under the Protection from Online Falsehoods and Manipulation Act (Pofma) against the anti-death penalty activist group Transformative Justice Collective for their social media posts, which falsely stated that Roslan, Pausi, and Rosman had been executed despite allegedly having intellectual and psycho-social disabilities. The Ministry of Home Affairs (MHA) issued a statement confirming that the courts had repeatedly upheld in several appeals that the men did not suffer from diminished responsibility, despite their claimed intellectual disabilities.

== See also ==
- Capital punishment in Singapore
