= Rosman Abdullah =

Singaporean convicted drug trafficker hanged in 2024

Rosman bin Abdullah
- Born: Rosman bin Abdullah; 19 February 1969; Singapore
- Died: 22 November 2024 (aged 55); Changi Prison, Singapore
- Cause of death: Execution by hanging
- Status: Executed
- Conviction: Drug trafficking
- Criminal charge: Trafficking of 57.43g of diamorphine
- Penalty: Death penalty

Details
- Imprisoned at: Changi Prison

Rosman bin Abdullah (19 February 1969 – 22 November 2024) was a Singaporean drug trafficker who was convicted of trafficking about 57.43g of diamorphine. Rosman was arrested on 20 March 2009 for the crime and sentenced to death on 14 September 2010. Rosman, who had since lost all his appeals against the death penalty, was hanged in Changi Prison on 22 November 2024.

== Criminal conduct and trial ==
On 20 March 2009, during an anti-drug operation by the Central Narcotics Bureau, Rosman bin Abdullah, then 40 years old, and a female accomplice, Aneeza d/o Abdul Majeed, were both arrested in a hotel at Bencoolen Street, Singapore. After the arrest of the pair, the police managed to recover four bundles of diamorphine (pure heroin) and in total, the diamorphine weighed 57.43g, which was nearly four times the minimum amount that mandated the death sentence under the Misuse of Drugs Act.

Rosman and Aneeza were both charged with capital drug trafficking, but after further investigations, Aneeza was later granted a discharge not amounting to an acquittal. She pleaded guilty to possessing and consuming amphetamine and was sentenced to 18 months in prison. After serving her sentence, she was released on 1 April 2010.

About a year after his arrest, Rosman stood trial at the High Court for the original drug trafficking charge. The prosecution, led by Crystal Ong, submitted that based on the investigations, Rosman had contacted a man known as "Ah Yong" and arranged for the delivery of diamorphine after Ah Yong agreed to agreed to sell Rosman two pounds of diamorphine for $18,000, and it was thus their case that Rosman had knowingly trafficked diamorphine with the knowledge that he had these drugs. They pointed out that Rosman had admitted in two statements that he was aware he was smuggling diamorphine. Aneeza, Rosman's accomplice and girlfriend, testified that she and Rosman consumed methamphetamine and had sex with each other in the hotel room (where they stayed for the last three days) before they were arrested by the CNB officers, and she heard Rosman informing the officers that he kept diamorphine inside the hotel safe.

In response, the defence counsel, led by Ram Goswami, argued that Rosman was unaware of the contents of the bundle and did not know he was smuggling diamorphine. When Rosman took the stand to enter his defence, he gave evidence that he was unaware of the presence of diamorphine in the bundles. He stated that back in 2003, he first met a man named Mahadhir bin Chari (alias May Day) during his previous stint in prison, and he was contacted by Mahadhir, who asked him to deliver illegal drugs to him, and Rosman was told that the bundles did not contain diamorphine but another drug called Erimin. Rosman's defence was that he mistook the diamorphine to be Erimin after being lied to by Mahadhir, and that the investigating officer, Sergeant Muhammad Fardlie, had coerced him into admitting to having knowledge of the diamorphine in his possession under the promise that he would not face the death penalty.

Sergeant Fardlie, however, testified that he never induced Rosman into confessing and added that he did not know who Mahadhir was or what the relationship between him and Rosman was, and there were testimonies adduced to show that Rosman had told police that there was diamorphine in his possession and that he never mentioned Mahadhir in any of his statements to the police.

On 14 September 2010, the trial judge, Justice Tay Yong Kwang delivered his verdict. He found that Rosman indeed had the knowledge that he was trafficking diamorphine and agreed that his statements to the police were not made under duress or inducement, and noted that Rosman failed to summon Mahadhir as his witness to corroborate his court testimony, which should not be relied on. Per Justice Tay's decision, 41-year-old Rosman Abdullah was found guilty of drug trafficking and sentenced to death by hanging.

== Appeal processes ==
=== Direct appeal and clemency petition ===
After he was sentenced to hang, Rosman Abdullah filed an appeal to the Court of Appeal. However, the appeal was dismissed on 26 April 2011.

Afterwards, Rosman petitioned for clemency from the President of Singapore, and if successful, his death sentence would be commuted to life imprisonment. The President eventually chose to not grant clemency to Rosman and hence, rejected his petition on 25 July 2011.

=== Re-sentencing plea ===
A year after Rosman's appeal was rejected, Singapore chose to revise its death penalty laws in July 2012, instituting a moratorium on all 35 executions in the country, including Rosman's. The amendments, which came into effect in January 2013, granted judges in Singapore the discretion to sentence drug traffickers to life imprisonment with a minimum of 15 strokes of the cane, instead of the death penalty, if they were only couriers. This option was available if the offender received a certificate of substantive assistance from the public prosecutor for aiding the narcotics police in disrupting drug trafficking. Additionally, life imprisonment could be granted if the offender was found to have diminished responsibility due to a mental illness that significantly impaired their mental faculties, in which case the death sentence and caning would not apply.

Rosman was one of the death row inmates in Singapore who petitioned for re-sentencing by the High Court, and his case was sent back to the High Court for re-sentencing before the original trial judge Tay Yong Kwang. On 24 February 2015, the re-sentencing hearing began at the High Court, with Rosman seeking to be re-sentenced to life imprisonment on the grounds that he only acted as a courier. Rosman also requested the court to recognize him as a courier and issue a certificate of substantive assistance, which the prosecution had not provided in his case.

On 3 November 2015, Justice Tay ruled that Rosman was not a courier and there were evidence that he had actively participated in sourcing for the drugs and acted as the middleman in the negotiations between Mahadhir and Ah Yong, took payment and even re-packed the drugs for sale, which went beyond the courier's roles of merely delivering the drugs. As such, the death sentence of Rosman was once again maintained by the High Court.

Rosman later appealed to the Court of Appeal to commute his death sentence. He also submitted a new psychiatric report by Dr Munidasa Winslow, a psychiatrist in private practice, to seek a reduction of his death sentence on the grounds of diminished responsibility. According to Dr Winslow's report, Rosman suffered from attention deficit hyperactivity disorder (ADHD), which went undiagnosed before 2016, and the diagnosis was made based on alleged symptoms shown during Rosman's early years and school records. He also noted that Rosman had an extensive polysubstance use history, which stemmed from childhood neglect and exacerbated by his low IQ and undiagnosed ADHD, and the condition had a contributory effect to his offence of drug trafficking. However, the psychiatric reports provided by the Institute of Mental Health (IMH) showed that there was no abnormality of the mind in Rosman's case.

On 21 November 2016, the Court of Appeal rejected Rosman's follow-up appeal and confirmed the death penalty for Rosman, after rejecting his defence of diminished responsibility and the prior arguments made in the High Court.

=== Civil lawsuit in 2021 ===
Rosman was also involved in a separate lawsuit concerning allegations that private letters between death row inmates and their lawyers or families were being sent from prisons to the Attorney-General's Chambers (AGC). This led the inmates to initiate legal action against the AGC or its officials for alleged misconduct, violations of their rights, and seeking damages for any harm caused. Rosman, along with 21 other death row inmates (mostly convicted for drug trafficking), was represented by human rights lawyer M. Ravi to identify those responsible for sending the inmates' information to the AGC. The lawsuit was dismissed on 16 March 2021, and the inmates, including Rosman, were ordered to pay $10 in costs. Later, Rosman, along with 12 other prisoners from the original group of 22 plaintiffs, filed civil suits against the Attorney-General of Singapore regarding this matter. However, the lawsuit was withdrawn in November 2021 by their lawyer, Ravi, who also had to cover the costs of over $10,000 associated with the case.

=== Racial discrimination lawsuit ===
In August 2021, 17 Malay death row inmates, including Rosman, filed an appeal against their sentences, claiming racial discrimination. They pointed out that between 2010 and 2021, Malays accounted for 66 out of 120 drug trafficking prosecutions, with over 76% of them receiving death sentences. Furthermore, 50 of the 77 individuals sentenced to death during this period were Malays. Rosman and the other inmates argued that the prosecution of capital cases was influenced by racial bias, highlighting the disproportionate number of Malays on Singapore's death row. However, the courts rejected the lawsuit on December 2, 2021, stating there was no evidence of racial discrimination in the treatment of the inmates. The allegations were deemed to be an abuse of the court system, as they could undermine the integrity and reputation of Singapore's legal system. The two lawyers representing the inmates, Cheng Kim Kuan and M. Ravi, were both ordered to pay S$10,000 in costs for filing the lawsuit.

== 2022 execution attempt ==
Originally, Rosman Abdullah was scheduled to be executed on 23 February 2022. His execution date was one week after the scheduled hangings of both Roslan Bakar and Pausi Jefridin, who were convicted of drug trafficking. At that time, the scheduling of the executions of both Roslan and Pausi garnered widespread controversy due to the fact that the inmates in question were reportedly diagnosed with low IQ, and the anti-death penalty groups argued that the death penalty should not be carried out for both men on the grounds that they had intellectual disabilities, and this was also related to the case of Nagaenthran Dharmalingam, who was also sentenced to death despite his alleged intellectual disability and both local and international pleas of clemency. Although Roslan and Pausi lost their last-minute appeals to stave off their executions, the President of Singapore granted the duo a respite to postpone their executions while pending further appeals.

Rosman, who received his death warrant a week in advance of his execution date, filed an appeal to delay the execution. Subsequently, the execution was staved off and Rosman was allowed to appeal in the same case as both Roslan and Pausi against the constitutionality of the death penalty. Amnesty International, an international human rights group, described the increased spate of scheduled executions as "appalling" and called on Singapore to implement a moratorium on the death penalty. The European Union (EU) similarly appealed to the Singapore government to not execute Rosman and reiterated that the death penalty should be abolished in Singapore. The Anti-Death Penalty Asia Network (ADPAN) also released a statement to implore the Singaporean authorities to spare the lives of Rosman and those who were recently scheduled for execution.

On 16 March 2022, High Court Judge Kannan Ramesh rejected the appeals of Rosman, Pausi and Roslan. The judge found that the trio submitted rehashed arguments which were rejected in prior proceedings, and hence, the trio's actions amounted to an abuse of the court process and it was more likely a tactical ploy to delay their executions.

In the aftermath, Roslan and Pausi remained on death row for another two years before they were hanged in Changi Prison on 15 November 2024.

== Further appeals ==
=== Lawsuit against Attorney-General ===
On 3 August 2022, Rosman was among the 24 condemned prisoners (which included murderer Iskandar Rahmat and drug traffickers Pannir Selvam Pranthaman and Abdul Rahim Shapiee) who filed a lawsuit against the Attorney-General, claiming that the obstruction of their access to legal counsel forced them to argue their appeals without representation. This, they argued, resulted in an unfair legal process. However, the High Court dismissed the lawsuit, stating that lawyers had valid reasons for refusing death row cases. Additionally, there was no evidence to suggest that the strict court orders and financial penalties imposed on lawyers for submitting unmeritorious appeals had caused widespread fear among lawyers in defending death row inmates. The follow-up appeal related to this lawsuit was likewise rejected by the Court of Appeal on 4 August 2022. In the aftermath, one of the prisoners, Abdul Rahim, was executed on 5 August 2022, the day after the loss of the lawsuit.

=== Legal challenge against Pacc Act ===
In December 2023, Rosman was among 36 death row inmates who filed a legal motion to challenge the newly introduced Post-Appeal Applications in Capital Cases Act (PACC Act). This law was aimed at addressing last-minute appeals from death row prisoners who had exhausted all other avenues of appeal. Rosman and the other plaintiffs argued that the law was discriminatory and would deprive death row inmates of their last opportunity for justice, potentially leading to an unfair legal process. However, Justice Hoo Sheau Peng of the High Court dismissed the lawsuit, stating that the law was enacted in response to the rising number of last-minute appeals and the misuse of court processes. The purpose of the law was to filter out meritless appeals. Justice Hoo further noted that the Act's provisions did not violate the legal rights of the death row prisoners, as the law had not yet been enforced. A follow-up appeal by the same 36 plaintiffs was dismissed by the Court of Appeal on 27 March 2024.

=== Civil lawsuit in 2024 ===
Subsequently, Rosman was one of the 13 death row prisoners who filed a civil lawsuit against the Attorney-General’s Chambers (AGC) and Singapore Prison Service (SPS). They argued that there was a case of prison correspondence misconduct, which involved the prison authorities sharing the letters of the plaintiffs with the AGC, and the inmates sought damages for unlawful practice, breach of confidence and copyright infringement.

On 11 October 2024, the Court of Appeal's three judges – Chief Justice Sundaresh Menon, Senior Judge Judith Prakash and Justice Steven Chong – ruled that the AGC and SPS unlawfully breached the confidentiality of letters from 13 death-row inmates. The judges emphasized the importance of prisoners' rights to maintain confidential correspondence, particularly with legal counsel. Although SPS and AGC justified their actions by stating they needed legal advice, the court found no need to share these letters. The court also upheld nominal damages for copyright breach but denied any compensation for breach of confidence.

== 2024 death warrant and execution ==
Two years after he was nearly executed, Rosman Abdullah received his second death warrant, and he was scheduled to be executed by hanging on 22 November 2024.

In response to Rosman's second death warrant, the United Nations appealed to the Singapore government to stop the execution. Ravina Shamdasani, a spokesperson for the Office of the United Nations High Commissioner for Human Rights (OHCHR), implored to the government to commute Rosman's death sentence to life imprisonment. She argued that capital punishment for drug trafficking was unduly harsh and amounted to violation of the international human rights law, and criticised the death penalty for its lack of deterrent effect on crime, and declared that Singapore should conform to the international trend and abolish the death penalty. It was noted that at this point in time, Rosman was the longest-serving death row prisoner in Singapore at roughly 14 years.

Two days before Rosman was due to hang, human rights organisation Amnesty International called the scheduled hanging of Rosman "unlawful", and condemned Rosman's impending execution as a "chilling determination of the Singapore authorities to continue to implement the death penalty", and cited that the death penalty for drug trafficking was not aligned with international law and a violation of the commitment to apply capital punishment for only the worst of the worst crimes, for which drug trafficking was not included.

The European Union (EU) also released a statement on the eve of Rosman's execution. In the statement, signed by the EU Member States and of Norway, Switzerland and the United Kingdom, the EU appealed to the Singapore authorities to abolish capital punishment, stating that the death penalty was a "cruel, inhumane and degrading" punishment, which was "incompatible with the inalienable right to life", and condemned both the death warrant of Rosman and the two prior executions of drug traffickers that happened a week before Rosman's scheduled hanging.

On 22 November 2024, 55-year-old Rosman Abdullah was hanged in Changi Prison at dawn. The Central Narcotics Bureau (CNB) confirmed Rosman's execution in a media statement, stating that Rosman had been "accorded full due process" under the law, and he was represented by counsel throughout the process.

Rosman was the eighth condemned inmate to be hanged in Singapore during the year 2024, and before him, six drug convicts and one convicted murderer were put to death. Rosman was also the 24th death row inmate to be executed in Singapore since the city-state's resumption of executions in March 2022, after a two-year moratorium during the COVID-19 pandemic.

On 26 November 2024, a correction order was issued under the Protection from Online Falsehoods and Manipulation Act (Pofma) against the anti-death penalty activist group Transformative Justice Collective for their social media posts, which falsely claimed that Rosman and the two others (identified as Roslan Bakar and Pausi Jefridin) hanged a week before him were executed despite their alleged intellectual and psycho-social disabilities. The Ministry of Home Affairs (MHA) released a statement to confirm that the courts had already upheld in multiple appeals that the men never suffered from diminished responsibility in spite of their purported intellectual disabilities.

== See also ==
- Capital punishment in Singapore
