= Alvin Yeo =

Singaporean lawyer and politician (1962–2022)

Alvin Yeo SC
- 杨康海

Member of Parliament for Chua Chu Kang GRC (Nanyang Division)
- In office 7 May 2011 – 25 August 2015
- Preceded by: Constituency established
- Succeeded by: PAP held
- Majority: 32,825 (22.40%)

Member of Parliament for Hong Kah GRC (Nanyang Division)
- In office 27 April 2006 – 18 April 2011
- Preceded by: PAP held
- Succeeded by: Constituency abolished
- Majority: N/A (walkover)

Personal details
- Born: 28 March 1962 State of Singapore
- Died: 30 July 2022 (aged 60) Singapore
- Party: People's Action Party
- Spouse: Chan Hee Lien
- Children: 2
- Education: King's College London (LLB)
- Occupation: Lawyer; politician

Alvin Yeo Khirn Hai SC (Chinese: 杨康海; pinyin: Yáng Kānghǎi; 28 March 1962 – 30 July 2022) was a Singaporean lawyer and politician who co-founded WongPartnership, one of the Big Four law firms in Singapore. As a member of the governing People's Action Party (PAP), he was the Member of Parliament (MP) representing the Nanyang division of Hong Kah Group Representation Constituency (GRC) between 2006 and 2011, and later Chua Chu Kang GRC between 2011 and 2015.

== Education ==
Yeo obtained his LLB from King's College London in 1985. He was thereafter admitted to the English Bar in 1986 before being admitted to the Singapore Bar in 1987.

== Career ==
=== Politics ===
Yeo was a member of the People's Action Party. He served as Member of Parliament for Hong Kah GRC from 2006 to 2011, and for Chua Chu Kang GRC from 2011 to 2015.

At the 2015 general elections, he retired from politics, with Yee Chia Hsing succeeding in his seat, even as the GRC was downsized from a five member to a four member GRC. During his time as a Member of Parliament, he was Chairman of the Government Parliamentary Committee for Home Affairs and Law. Yeo has been described as a caring MP who was "the perfect gentleman" during his time in politics.

=== Legal ===
Yeo was called to the bar in 1988. In 1992, Yeo founded the law firm, WongPartnership along with Dilhan Pillay Sandrasegara, Sundaresh Menon, and Wong Meng Meng (the lawyer the firm is named after). In 2000, Yeo was appointed as a senior counsel, making him the youngest ever lawyer to be named at just 37 years of age. He had an illustrious career as a litigator, specialising in banking and corporate disputes as well as construction related matters. he also handled billion dollar and international claims in his career. He has been called a "giant in the legal fraternity".

On 31 July 2017, a complaint of possible overcharging by Yeo was made by three Court of Appeal judges to the Law Society. The legal bill that was sent to a wealthy widow, who Yeo represented between November 2010 to June 2015 in series of legal proceedings was S$8.8 million. The judges were concerned by the amount charged and with the client's lack of mental capacity. The bill was later discounted by 32.5 percent. On 19 June 2019, a Law Society disciplinary tribunal dismissed the complaint. On 24 June 2019, the Law Society sought a review of the tribunal to the High Court of Singapore. On 8 January 2020, the High Court later ordered for another round of disciplinary tribunal hearings after having found that the original charges brought on by Law Society were not framed properly as they excluded considerations for the client's lack of mental capacity, and also that the original tribunal had decided that the mental capacity issues were not within the scope of complaint, contrary to some of the initial concerns raised by the Appeal judges. On objections from Yeo's lawyers that he would have to be investigated again, the High Court judge presiding over the matter, Justice Valerie Thean, called the situation "unfortunate" and cited a 2008 parliamentary act that forbids any judicial review while disciplinary proceedings are ongoing, and thus the Court could only review the matter after the disciplinary proceedings completed. Justice Thean also noted that Yeo was fully prepared to defend himself in any new disciplinary proceedings.

Yeo was the chairman and senior partner of WongPartnership, a position he occupied from 2007. Prior to this, he was Managing Partner of the firm. A distinguished lawyer who has been described as brilliant and warm, Yeo tripled the size of WongPartnership during his tenure there and was inducted into the Hall of Fame by Legal 500 in 2021. He also developed its regional network in Asean, China and the Middle East.

=== Business ===
After Peter Lim owned Valencia CF in 2014, he appointed a new board of directors which included Yeo. Yeo held the directorship until his death in 2022.

== Personal life ==
Yeo was married to Chan Hee Lien and had two children. He died on 30 July 2022 from cancer, aged 60. He was an Arsenal fan, who enjoyed watching football.

== Accolades ==
- 2017 – Outstanding Contribution to the Legal Profession, Chambers Asia-Pacific
