= Shook Lin & Bok =

Law firm in Singapore

Shook Lin & Bok is a law firm with offices in Singapore and Malaysia.

== History ==
Shook Lin & Bok began in 1918 as Messrs Yong Shook Lin, a Kuala Lumpur law firm. That year, Yong Shook Lin was admitted as the first Chinese to the Malayan bar after graduating from Cambridge University. In 1938, the firm recruited another partner, Tan Teow Bok, and was renamed Messrs Shook Lin & Bok. Yong's son, Pung How, would later join the firm in 1952 after graduating with a double-first degree in law from his father's alma mater, initially practicing mostly criminal law. Under the Pung How leadership as a senior partner, the firm grew to be one of the largest firms in Malaya.

In 1964, Shook Lin opened an office in Singapore, and by the 1980s, it was considered one of the four local leading law firms of the time. In 2001, it was among the first batch of joint law ventures approved by the Singaporean government to operate a partnership with Allen & Overy. The partnership dissolved in 2009.

=== Ransomware attack (2024) ===
On 9 April 2024, Shook Lin discovered that it had been the victim of a ransomware attack. According to the law firm, it immediately engaged a cybersecurity team and there was no evidence that the firm's core document management systems were affected.

Shook Lin did not respond to media queries about whether it had paid any ransom in connection with the ransomware attack, but according to an independent website, SuspectFile, which initially broke the news, the law firm paid 21.07 bitcoins to the Akira ransomware group which claimed responsibility for the attack. The payment was spread across three transactions and was equivalent to about SGD 1.89 million at the time of payment.

== Alumni ==
=== Judiciary ===
- Yong Pung How, second Chief Justice of Singapore
- Thean Lip Ping, Justice of the Court of Appeal
- Chan Sek Keong, third Chief Justice of Singapore
- Sundaresh Menon, fourth Chief Justice of Singapore
- Philip Pillai, Justice of the High Court of Singapore
- Vinodh Coomaraswamy, Justice of the High Court of Singapore

=== Private practice ===
- Patrick Yu, Hong Kong barrister
- Wong Meng Meng SC, founder of WongPartnership
- Param Cumaraswamy, a lawyer specialising in human rights, UN rapporteur and Gruber Prize for Justice laureate
- Cyrus V. Das, later Honorary Life President of the Commonwealth Lawyers Association.
