= Roszaidi Osman =

Singaporean drug trafficker

- Born: Roszaidi bin Osman; 1972 (age 53–54); Singapore
- Spouse: Azidah binte Zainal
- Children: 2
- Status: Imprisoned at Changi Prison since October 2015
- Convictions: Drug possession (1995); Drug possession (2000); Drug consumption (2000); Buprenorphine trafficking (2007); Buprenorphine consumption (2007); Drug possession (2012); Diamorphine trafficking (2019)
- Criminal charges: Multiple counts of drug consumption and possession (1995–2012); Diamorphine trafficking (2015)
- Penalty: Six months' imprisonment (1995); Five years and three weeks' imprisonment (2000); Five years' imprisonment with five strokes of the cane (2007; concurrent); Seven years and six months' imprisonment with six strokes of the cane (2007; concurrent); Three years' imprisonment (2012); Death, later commuted to life imprisonment (2022)

Roszaidi bin Osman (born c. 1972) is a Singaporean drug trafficker who is presently serving a life sentence for trafficking in 32.54g of diamorphine (or pure heroin) in October 2015. Roszaidi and four others (including his then pregnant wife) were all arrested and charged with capital drug trafficking, though eventually, in January 2019, only Roszaidi and one accomplice out of the remaining four were found guilty as charged and sentenced to death. The remaining three, including Roszaidi's wife, were given jail terms ranging between 25 years and life.

Following an appeal in 2020, the co-accused on death row was acquitted of the charge and escaped the gallows, but Roszaidi's conviction was upheld. However, Roszaidi was temporarily reprieved from death row and granted a re-trial to review his sentence on the grounds of diminished responsibility. After the High Court restored Roszaidi's death sentence in his re-trial, Roszaidi filed a second appeal, and by a rare split decision of 3 to 2, the Court of Appeal allowed Roszaidi's appeal and commuted his death sentence to life imprisonment in December 2022.

== Personal life ==
Born in 1972, Roszaidi bin Osman, who had at least one younger brother, grew up in Singapore. His father was a drug addict who smoked marijuana (or cannabis), and due to this, Roszaidi first smoked cannabis at age ten, and he often consumed drugs with his friends, sometimes even using the pocket money (originally intended for buying food) given by his mother and grandmother to purchase drugs. He also began consume other drugs since age 12, ranging from heroin, erimin and dormicum.

Likely because of his frequent drug abuse, Roszaidi did not perform well in school. He failed the Primary School Leaving Examination (PSLE) thrice before he further his studies in secondary school, but he dropped out of school after his Secondary Two year at age 17, and he even dropped out after completing only one year of training at the Vocational and Industrial Training Board (now renamed as Institute of Technical Education or ITE).

Roszaidi married his wife Azidah binte Zainal (aged 32 in 2015) since March 2015, and together, the couple had one daughter as of October 2015, and their second child of unknown gender was born sometime after Roszaidi's arrest in 2015 for drug trafficking.

== Criminal records ==
As a result of his heavy drug use, Roszaidi had spent nearly 18 years of his adulthood from 1990 to 2015 behind bars, including at the drug rehabilitation centres and prison. These criminal records were first revealed in April 2022 while Roszaidi was appealing to commute his death sentence for diamorphine trafficking.

On 1 March 1990, when Roszaidi was around 18 years old, he was detained at the drug rehabilitation centre for six months on account of his drug consumption. On 28 May 1990, he was placed under drug supervision for 24 months. On 26 June 1990, Roszaidi spent another six months at the rehabilitation centre. On 14 June 1991, when he was around 19 years old, Roszaidi was under drug supervision for another 24 months. On 24 January 1992, when Roszaidi was around 20 years old, he spent a third period of six months at the rehabilitation centre. And on 16 January 1995, when Roszaidi was around 23 years old, he was once again placed under drug supervision for 24 months.

Just over a week later in the same year, on 24 January 1995, Roszaidi was found guilty of one count of unauthorised possession of a controlled drug and sentenced to six months' imprisonment. A few months later, on 24 July 1995, Roszaidi was again detained at the rehabilitation centre for six months. On 16 July 1997, Roszaidi was placed under drug supervision for 24 months after his release. On 4 October 1997, Roszaidi was caught consuming morphine and thus sent back to the rehabilitation centre for six months. Two years later, in 1999, Roszaidi became addicted to heroin and he maintained the habit until 2006, the year when he had to undergo surgery.

On 23 February 2000, 28-year-old Roszaidi, who was caught with morphine in his possession, was convicted of illegally possessing a controlled drug and drug consumption. For these two offences, he was sentenced to five years and three weeks' imprisonment (including a concurrent two-year sentence for the first charge). He also faced a third charge of consumption of cannabinol derivatives, which was taken into consideration during sentencing. On 28 July 2003, Roszaidi was released from prison on parole for good behaviour, but he was placed under drug supervision for 24 months for his consumption of morphine. During his time at the programme, Roszaidi worked as a production officer in Jurong Island, and he kept the job for three years.

In 2006, Roszaidi was assigned to the Institute of Mental Health's addiction department for a drug rehabilitation programme. However, even then, he continued to smoke diamorphine regularly. On 2 February 2007, after being caught in 2006 for importing a controlled drug called buprenorphine, Roszaidi, then 35, was brought to court and sentenced to five years' imprisonment with five strokes of the cane. He was also convicted of one charge of consuming buprenorphine and was sentenced to a concurrent jail term of seven years and six months, along with an additional six strokes of the cane. Two further charges - one of buprenorphine consumption and one of buprenorphine importation - were taken into consideration during sentencing. He served five years out of the sentence before being released on parole in 2011. He consequently stayed away from drugs for a year before being caught again for possession of diamorphine (or pure heroin). He was later placed under drug supervision for 24 months for his consumption of buprenorphine on 3 December 2012. He was also sentenced on 24 August 2012 to three years' imprisonment.

Sometime in 2014, when Roszaidi was around 42 years old, he was paroled and released early for good behaviour. At that point, Roszaidi's father died from unknown causes in the same year prior to Roszaidi's release. Thereafter, he worked at a chemical company for a few months under the Work Release Scheme (a programme that helps integrate ex-prisoners and find them work). Sometime in December 2014 or January 2015, Roszaidi resigned from his chemical company job and worked at a flour company for roughly six months before he quit this new job in May 2015. Shortly before he resigned, Roszaidi's grandmother and mother died, and according to a psychiatric report, Roszaidi's sadness over the double deaths of his grandmother and mother had directly led to a significant increased rate of drug consumption and he also began to exhibit depressive symptoms since then.

== 2015 drug trafficking charge ==
=== Background and arrest ===
Prior to July 2015, Roszaidi first met a man nicknamed "Is Cangeh" in prison while serving his seven-and-a-half year sentence for buprenorphine trafficking in 2007. In July 2015, he decided to help Is Cangeh to deliver drugs. During each delivery, Roszaidi, who never had enough money to buy drugs, would siphon off a portion of these drugs for his personal consumption.

On 6 October 2015, Roszaidi was going on a shopping trip with his wife and their daughter, when Is Cangeh contacted him to deliver another package of drugs. Together with his 22-year-old friend Mohammad Azli Mohammad Salleh, Roszaidi went to Bulim Avenue, with Azli driving him to his destination. Upon his arrival, Roszaidi collected a red plastic bag from two Malaysian men: Aishamudin Jamaludin and Suhaizam Khariri. Court documents revealed that the bag contained two packets of diamorphine (or pure heroin) and three packets of methamphetamine. After Roszaidi collected the drugs, Azli drove him back to his Jurong West home, where Roszaidi passed the package to his wife. Shortly after, officers of the Central Narcotics Bureau (CNB) arrested Aishamudin after they were observing him in surveillance and followed his lorry. The arrest of Aishamudin also led to the capture of Azli, Roszaidi, Azidah and Suhaizam.

Altogether, five people, including Roszaidi and his wife, were arrested and charged for drug trafficking. The amount of diamorphine trafficked by Roszaidi weighed 32.54g, which was more than twice the minimum amount of 15g that mandated the death sentence under the Misuse of Drugs Act (MDA). Although the death penalty was the only sentence available for capital drug trafficking, suspected drug traffickers could still be spared the gallows and sentenced to life imprisonment on the condition that they either acted as couriers and provided substantive assistance, or that they suffered from diminished responsibility at the time of the offence(s).

Before the start of Roszaidi's trial (jointly with Azli and Aishammudin), both Azidah and Suhaizam were separately dealt in court for their roles in Roszaidi's drug smuggling case. Suhaizam pleaded guilty to a reduced charge for trafficking not less than 14.99g of diamorphine and a second charge of trafficking not less than 249.67g of methamphetamine was taken into consideration for the purpose of his sentencing. Suhaizam's sentence for his conviction was 25 years' imprisonment and 15 strokes of the cane. He had since lost his appeal against the sentence. As for Azidah, who was pregnant with their second child at the time of her arrest, she was similarly convicted of trafficking not less than 14.99g of diamorphine. She also pleaded guilty to one count of consuming methamphetamine, and consented to have a third charge of trafficking not less than 166.44g of methamphetamine taken into consideration for the purpose of sentencing. Azidah was therefore sentenced to 25 years' imprisonment.

=== Death penalty trial ===
On 13 March 2018, 46-year-old Roszaidi Osman and two of his accomplices - 33-year-old Aishamudin Jamaludin and 25-year-old Mohammad Azli Mohammad Salleh - jointly stood trial for their respective roles in smuggling 32.54g of diamorphine.

During the trial, Roszaidi's defence was that he never knew about the contents of the drugs he was asked to deliver by Is Cangeh's request, but his statements proven otherwise, and the prosecution argued that Roszaidi had not rebutted the legal presumption of him having knowledge of the nature of the drugs he delivered, and he should be convicted as charged. As for both Azli and Aishamudin, Azli denied the prosecution's contention that he abetted Roszaidi to traffic drugs and his defence was he never knew that the exact contents of the drugs turned out to be diamorphine, although he conceded that he knew methamphetamine was among the contents of the drug package collected by Roszaidi, and Aishamudin himself also denied having any knowledge that he was delivering diamorphine and only admitted to smuggling methamphetamine.

On 21 January 2019, the trial judge Choo Han Teck of the High Court delivered his judgement, ruling that the prosecution had proven their cases against the trio beyond a reasonable doubt, and thus rejecting the defences of all the three defendants, but he also accepted that Aishamudin's charge should not be different from that of Suhaizam due to them having shared the common intention to deliver the drugs to Roszaidi. As such, Justice Choo found both Azli and Roszaidi guilty of capital drug trafficking and sentenced both of them to death, since both Azli and Roszaidi were not proven to be merely acting as couriers at the time of the offence. Aishamudin, on the other hand, had his charge reduced to a lesser offence of trafficking not less than 14.99g of diamorphine (the same charge Suhaizam was convicted of) and he was sentenced to 25 years' imprisonment and 15 strokes of the cane.

== 2020 appeals and re-trial ==
=== Appeal against conviction and sentence ===
After the both of them were sentenced to death, Roszaidi and Azli each filed an appeal against their conviction and sentence. At that point, Roszaidi engaged a renowned criminal lawyer Eugene Thuraisingam to represent him during his appeal. The defence was not the only side that filed appeals in relation to the trial verdict. The prosecution, at the same time, lodged an appeal against the trial judge's decision to reduce Aishamudin's charge and also appealed against Aishamudin's 25-year sentence. These appeals were heard in a separate court hearing.

=== Verdict and remittal of case ===
On 23 April 2020, the Court of Appeal's five judges - Chief Justice Sundaresh Menon, and four Judges of Appeal Judith Prakash, Tay Yong Kwang, Andrew Phang and Steven Chong - delivered their judgement regarding the appeals of Roszaidi and Azli through a virtual court hearing conducted via Zoom. This virtual court hearing was conducted as a result of the COVID-19 pandemic in Singapore and the two-month nationwide lockdown, which suspended all physical court sessions and led to the Singaporean courts switching to virtual hearing of court cases.

In the case of Azli, the Court of Appeal found that although Azli knew that Roszaidi was delivering drugs, he never had the exact knowledge on the nature of the drugs and what were the contents of the package, and he likely only found out that Roszaidi was dealing with diamorphine after his arrest and during his interrogation. There was no evidence to suggest that Azli had agreed to help Roszaidi to smuggle drugs in spite of his knowledge of Roszaidi's involvement in drug trafficking, aside from his lack of knowledge of the nature of drugs. Therefore, the five-judge Court of Appeal felt that it was unsustainable to uphold Azli's conviction on the basis of legal presumption of knowledge. In conclusion, the Court of Appeal's five-judge panel set aside Azli's conviction and sentence and granted him a full acquittal of all charges.

On the other hand, Roszaidi's appeal against his conviction was dismissed. Still, the five-judge panel noted that Thuraisingam had submitted new psychiatric evidence to support a newly raised defence of diminished responsibility on Roszaidi's behalf, and they therefore agreed that the evidence, while it should be admitted earlier during the trial, should warrant a re-trial with regards to the appropriate sentence Roszaidi should receive. As such, they ordered that his case should be remitted to the High Court for a re-sentencing hearing, in order to fully assess the psychiatric evidence and decide if Roszaidi should be given a life sentence on the grounds of diminished responsibility.

Meanwhile, the prosecution's appeals regarding Aishamudin's case were both heard and allowed by the Court of Appeal three months later on 17 July 2020, and 35-year-old Aishamudin Jamaludin's sentence was increased to life imprisonment with fifteen strokes of the cane after he was convicted of the revived original drug charge. The apex court agreed that the charges against Suhaizam (for 14.99g of diamorphine) and Aishamudin (for 32.54g of diamorphine) were not inconsistent charges, given that these charges formed part of "a single coherent world of facts", meaning both of them shared the common intention to traffic 32.54g of diamorphine. Given that Aishamudin was acknowledged and certified to be acting as a mere courier while committing the crime and provided full cooperation during investigations, he evaded the death penalty and instead sentenced to incarceration for life, though he still had to undergo his original caning sentence of 15 strokes of the cane.

=== High Court re-trial ===
On 12 October 2020, Roszaidi's re-trial took place before the original trial judge Choo Han Teck at the High Court.

Dr Jacob Rajesh, a consultant psychiatrist engaged by the defence, testified in court that Roszaidi suffered from two psychiatric illnesses: namely major depressive disorder and substance use disorder. Relying on the fact that Roszaidi consumed drugs since his childhood and his emotional loss over the double deaths of his mother and grandmother, Dr Rajesh said that Roszaidi began to manifest symptoms of depression before he committed the offence of drug trafficking, and at the time of the offence, the severity of his depression had worsened by then, and the combination of depression and substance use disorder (which explained his escalated drug use and lack of abstinence from drug use) had substantially affected his mental responsibility. Dr Bharat Saluja, the prosecution's psychiatric expert, stated that he agreed with Dr Rajesh that Roszaidi indeed suffered from both the aforementioned disorders. However, he disagreed that Roszaidi's mental faculties had been substantially impaired by one or both of these disorders, and found the symptoms of these two illnesses relatively mild at the time of the offences, and Roszaidi was therefore not suffering from diminished responsibility.

On 1 February 2021, Justice Choo delivered his judgement at the end of Roszaidi's re-trial. The judge accepted that Roszaidi indeed suffered from both depression and substance use disorder at the material time. However, Justice Choo held that Roszaidi's mental responsibility was not substantially impaired at the time of the offence, because Roszaidi was able to make reasoned choices and conscious decisions to smuggle drugs on Is Cangeh's behalf, and he was able to plan and execute plans and arrangements to smuggle drugs in a "logical and organised manner". Therefore, Justice Choo ruled that Roszaidi did not suffer from diminished responsibility and hence, no order shall be made to convert his original sentence of death to life imprisonment. As a result, Roszaidi’s death sentence was reinstated and he was thus sent back to death row.

== Final appeal and commutation of sentence ==
After the re-trial ended, Roszaidi appealed against the re-trial decision in April 2022, seeking to once again review his case and his defence counsel - Eugene Thuraisingam, Johannes Hadi, Shobna Chandran and Thaddaeus Aaron Tan Yong Zhong - raised the same arguments in favour of Roszaidi's case.

On 1 December 2022, the Court of Appeal made its final verdict relating to Roszaidi's sentence. By a majority decision of 3–2, the five-judge panel officially commuted Roszaidi's death sentence to life imprisonment, which therefore allowed him to escape the gallows. Out of the five judges, three of them - Chief Justice Sundaresh Menon and two judges of Appeal Belinda Ang and Judith Prakash - opted to allow the appeal, while the remaining two - two Judges of Appeal Andrew Phang and Steven Chong - dissented.

In the majority judgement, which was read out by CJ Menon, the three judges were of the opinion that Roszaidi's mental responsibility was indeed substantially impaired by the combination of both his conditions of major depressive disorder and substance use disorder. They stated that Roszaidi's psychiatric condition indeed had a real and material influence on his mental state, mainly his ability to restrain himself from purchasing and consuming drugs, his decision to smuggle drugs as a means to feed his addiction, and passing the package of drugs to his wife. Centering on his decision to hand over the package to his then heavily pregnant wife, who was innocent of the crime and incriminated for the crime, his actions were done irrationally and out of impulse with considering the consequences, which showed the impairment of his decision-making ability. The judges also determined that Roszaidi's decision to traffic drugs to supply some for his use was "not a reasoned choice or the consequence of rational judgment, but rather the product of a disordered mind", as caused by the substance use disorder and worsened by his depression. They also noted that having suffered the double losses of his mother and grandmother, Roszaidi's rate of drug consumption escalated since he used drugs to lessen his heartbreak and his depressive symptoms were notably surfacing at around this timing, which also explained his inability to find and maintain stable employment. Given that these disorders had substantially distorted Roszaidi's mental responsibility at the time of the crime, the majority agree to revoke Roszaidi's death sentence and ruled that he should be sentenced to life in prison.

In the minority decision however, both Justice Phang and Justice Chong disagreed that the conditions were so severe to the extent of reducing Roszaidi's mental faculties, and did not, in their opinion, believe that there was a casual link between his depression and his increased rate of drug consumption. The minority concluded that Roszaidi's rational judgment was not sufficiently impaired at the time, and that he was thinking in a logical and organised manner, as demonstrated by how he noticed the weight of drugs being more than usual and thought of sending some to his wife for safekeeping, a decision which was also purportedly motivated by Roszaidi's "self-preservation". They pointed that it appeared to be an unintentional result when his wife became implicated for this incident. As such, they decided to dismiss Roszaidi's appeal in their minority judgement and uphold his death sentence, but since the majority already decided to commute Roszaidi's sentence, the minority cannot depart from the court's final decision on sentence.

In conclusion, in accordance to the majority judgement, 50-year-old Roszaidi Osman was spared the gallows and he was thus re-sentenced to life imprisonment under Section 33B(3)(b) of the Misuse of Drugs Act (MDA). Roszaidi was spared the cane due to his age of 50 at the time of his re-sentencing, and the MDA also prohibited caning for drug traffickers suffering from diminished responsibility.

== Aftermath ==
In the aftermath, Roszaidi's case was described to have set an important milestone with regards to the sentencing guidelines under Section 33B(3)(b) of the Misuse of Drugs Act (MDA), because it ruled that even if a person appeared to be capable of making rational decisions, he was still entitled to a defence of diminished responsibility should his mental responsibility was substantially impaired when he decided to commit drug trafficking, since his actions constituted as the product of an impaired mind.

When 39-year-old delivery driver Mohamed Shalleh Abdul Latiff was hanged for drug trafficking in August 2023, Roszaidi's case was brought up as a recent example of drug traffickers escaping the death penalty under the MDA on the grounds of diminished responsibility, and it was also discussed that the death penalty for drug traffickers was a complex issue due to the narrow definition of the "abnormality of the mind" and strict eligibility conditions for a trafficker to avoid execution, as demonstrated in the case of Nagaenthran K. Dharmalingam, whose death sentence was upheld despite his claims of intellectual disability, after the courts deemed he did not suffer from diminished responsibility, which was a contrast to Roszaidi's case. After losing his appeals, Nagaenthran had since executed on 27 April 2022, in spite of the international pressure to not carry out his hanging.

In an interview in February 2024, Roszaidi's former lawyer Eugene Thuraisingam spoke about the mental struggles of lawyers who handled cases where a person was at risk of the death penalty, as it carried the huge burden of helping a client to evade the gallows, and the outcome of the client being sentenced to hang would be "emotionally devastating" to a lawyer, who spent time and effort to defend them, as well as the fact that the lawyer formed a bond with the client and his or her family throughout the legal process. Thuraisingam described Roszaidi as one of his most memorable clients, and he said that his successful efforts to help Roszaidi escape the gallows brought about a sense of warmth and accomplishment. Thuraisingam revealed that since the end of Roszaidi's re-sentencing, he and his associates involved in Roszaidi's case would constantly receive electronic letters from Roszaidi (who remained in contact with them) on festive occasions, and Roszaidi would express his gratitude to Thuraisingam and the other lawyers each and every time he wrote to them. Thuraisingam recounted that whenever the letters came, Roszaidi's sincerity made him recall that his efforts to save Roszaidi were all worthwhile.

Since October 2015, Roszaidi remains incarcerated in Changi Prison while serving his life sentence. Although life imprisonment in Singapore was meant to be a term of incarceration for the remainder of a convict's natural life since the landmark appeal of Abdul Nasir Amer Hamsah on 20 August 1997, Roszaidi is still entitled to be released on parole after completing at least 20 years of his life term.

== See also ==
- Life imprisonment in Singapore
- Capital punishment in Singapore
