= V. K. Rajah =

Singaporean lawyer (born 1957)

V. K. Rajah SC
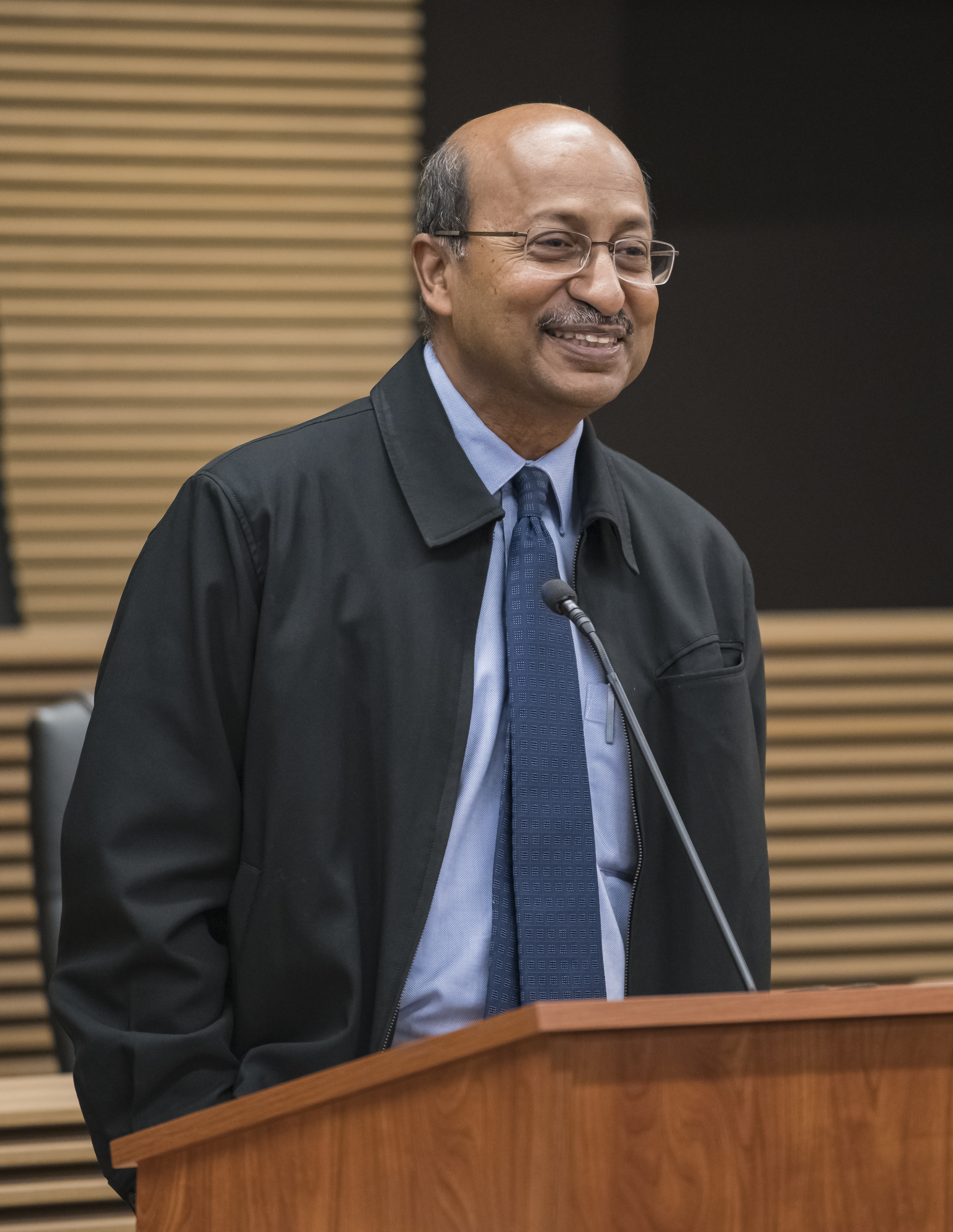
- Rajah in 2017 at SMU School of Law

8th Attorney-General of Singapore
- In office 25 June 2014 – 14 January 2017
- Appointed by: Tony Tan
- Deputy: Tan Siong Thye
- Preceded by: Steven Chong
- Succeeded by: Lucien Wong

Judge of the Court of Appeal of Singapore
- In office 11 April 2007 – 24 June 2014
- Appointed by: S. R. Nathan

Judge of the High Court of Singapore
- In office 1 November 2004 – 10 April 2007
- Appointed by: S. R. Nathan

Judicial Commissioner of the Supreme Court of Singapore
- In office 2 January 2004 – 31 October 2021
- Appointed by: S. R. Nathan

Personal details
- Born: 14 January 1957 (age 69) Colony of Singapore
- Parent: T. T. Rajah (father)
- Education: National University of Singapore (LLB); Trinity Hall, Cambridge (LLM)

Vijaya Kumar Rajah SC (born 14 January 1957) is a Singaporean lawyer who served as the eighth attorney-general of Singapore between 2014 and 2017. Prior to his appointment as attorney-general, he served as a judge of the Court of Appeal of Singapore between 2007 and 2014, and a judge of the High Court of Singapore between 2004 and 2007.

== Early life ==
Rajah was born in Singapore on 14 January 1957.

His father was Thampore Thamby Rajah, better known as T. T. Rajah, a leader of Barisan Sosialis, and founder of one of the "Big Four" law firms in Singapore, Rajah & Tann.

Rajah graduated from the National University of Singapore with a Bachelor of Laws degree in 1982.

He went on to complete a Master of Laws with first class degree at Trinity Hall, Cambridge in 1986.

== Career ==
Rajah was among the first batch of lawyers in Singapore to be appointed Senior Counsel in 1997, and was once the managing partner of law firm Rajah & Tann. He was also part of the National University of Singapore Faculty of Law moot team which won the Philip C. Jessup International Law Moot Court Competition in 1982, a first for the university. The other members of the team were Davinder Singh, Jimmy Yim and Steven Chong. He was first appointed Judicial Commissioner on 2 January 2004, Judge of the High Court on 1 November 2004, and subsequently Judge of Appeal in April 2007.

One of the cases presided by Rajah as a High Court judge was the 2006 case of Constance Chee Cheong Hin, a schizophrenic who was charged with throwing a girl off her HDB block and causing the death of four-year-old Sindee Neo. Chee was found guilty of manslaughter and kidnapping and although the prosecution sought a life sentence for Chee, Rajah sentenced Chee to thirteen years in jail after he duly considered that Chee had strong familial support and her condition would improve as long as she consistently adhere to medical treatment while in prison.

Rajah's publications include Judicial Management in Singapore (with T. C. Choong, Singapore: Butterworths, 1990). He was also the chair of a committee that produced an influential report in 2007 reviewing Singapore's legal sector.

Rajah has been a Director at Monetary Authority of Singapore since 1 November 2014.

Rajah served as Attorney-General of Singapore until he was succeeded by Lucien Wong on 14 January 2017. During his term, he "emphasised fair prosecution and outcomes", even appealing as a prosecutor for a reduced sentence in 2015, which was unprecedented in Singapore. Prime Minister Lee Hsien Loong thanked him for carrying out his duties "with dynamism and commitment".

In 2021, Rajah was appointed Vice-President of the International Chamber of Commerce's Court of Arbitration.

Mr. V. K. Rajah is also the Chair Professor of 'Chair on International Commercial Arbitration and Investment treaty Arbitration', instituted at NLUD by Justice Indu Malhotra, former Judge, Supreme Court of India.
