= Rajah & Tann =

Singaporean law firm

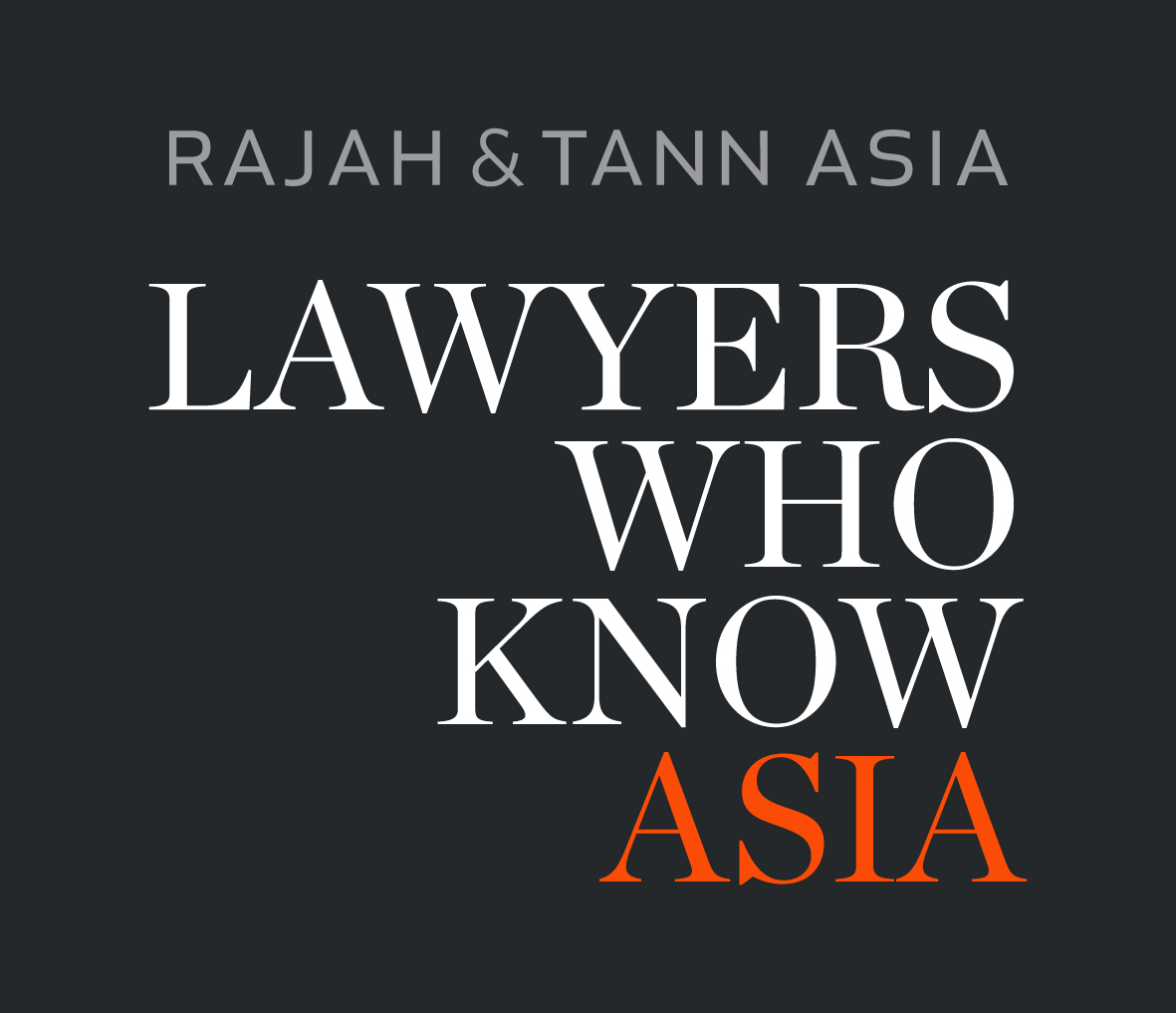
- Headquarters: Singapore
- No. of offices: 10
- No. of lawyers: 1,000+
- Major practice areas: General practice
- Key people: Ng Kim Beng (Managing Partner); Kelvin Poon (Deputy Managing Partner); Lee Eng Beng (Senior Partner and Chairperson of Rajah & Tann Asia)
- Date founded: 1976; 50 years ago
- Founder: T. T. Rajah; Tann Wee Tiong
- Company type: Limited liability partnership
- Website: www.rajahtannasia.com

Rajah & Tann Singapore LLP is a Singaporean law firm with affiliate offices in Cambodia, China, Indonesia, Laos, Malaysia, Myanmar, Philippines, Thailand and Vietnam. Founded in 1976, the firm is regarded as one of the Big Four law firms in Singapore. It is a member firm of Rajah & Tann Asia, a network of law firms in Southeast Asia with over 1,000 fee earners.

Rajah & Tann has practices in: banking, competition, corporate governance, corporate finance, dispute resolution, information technology, infrastructure, insolvency, insurance, mergers and acquisitions, shipping, telecommunications and trade. The firm is additionally known for its China, Japan and South Asia specific practice groups. Its network also includes R&T Asia Resources that procures project-specific in-house lawyers to support the firm's clients, R&T Technologies (a consulting firm that is focused on cybersecurity, data breach readiness and response), a virtual law academy, and other legaltech services.

Its clientele ranges from multinational and Fortune 500 corporations to emerging high-tech enterprises and start-ups. The firm is also a sole member from Singapore at Lex Mundi, an international professional services network.

The firm's notable alumni include V. K. Rajah, Steven Chong and Sundaresh Menon. Lee Eng Beng was the managing partner from 2010 to 2019. Patrick Ang succeeded Lee Eng Beng as the managing partner in 2019. In 2022, Kelvin Poon and Ng Kim Beng were appointed as Joint Deputy Managing Partners. In 2025, Patrick Ang stepped down and was replaced by Ng Kim Beng as Managing Partner.

== History ==
Rajah & Tann (then known as Tann Wee Tiong & T. T. Rajah) was founded by T. T. Rajah and Tann Wee Tiong in 1976. Rajah and Tann were also the founding members of People's Action Party and later members of the now-defunct Barisan Sosialis.

Rajah's son V. K. Rajah was appointed as the managing partner in 1987. He oversaw the growth of the firm from 6 lawyers to more than 160 lawyers and 200 staff. Steven Chong was appointed as the joint managing partner in 1998.

The firm established a representative office in Shanghai in 2003. In January 2004, Steven Chong became the sole managing partner when V. K. Rajah became a Judicial Commissioner.

Kuala Lumpur based Christopher & Lee Ong (formed by the merger of three Malaysian law firms), entered into an alliance with Rajah & Tann Asia in 2013.

The partnership law firm of Rajah & Tann converted to a limited liability partnership on 1 January 2008.

In August 2009, S.R. Nathan, former President of Singapore, appointed Steven Chong and deputy managing partner, Quentin Loh to the bench as Judicial Commissioners. Subsequently, Sundaresh Menon and Eng Beng Lee were appointed as managing and deputy managing partners respectively. In October 2010, Eng Beng Lee took over as the managing partner when Sundaresh Menon was appointed as the Attorney-General of Singapore.

In 2011, Rajah & Tann set up affiliate offices in Bangkok, Ho Chi Minh City and Vientiane as a part of its strategy for regional expansion. Furthermore, the firm tied up with local law firms in Phnom Penh, Jakarta and Yangon in 2013.

In January 2017, the Rajah & Tann Asia network absorbed Gatmaytan Yap Patacsil Gutierrez & Protacio (C&G Law) as its member firm in the Philippines.

In 2019, Patrick Ang succeeded Eng Beng Lee as the managing partner with Rebecca Chew being appointed the deputy managing partner of the firm. In 2022, the firm announced a new management team including appointing Ng Kim Beng and Kelvin Poon as joint deputy managing partners supporting Patrick Ang, the duo replacing Rebecca Chew. As part of the broader leadership transition, it was also announced that Adrian Wong also succeeded Leong Kah Wah as the head of disputes, with Vikram Nair serving as deputy head.

In July 2024, Rajah & Tann is set to expand its presence in China for the first time in 21 years. The firm will inaugurate a new office in Shenzhen, which is scheduled to open in the fourth quarter of the year. This expansion marks a significant return to the Chinese market for Rajah & Tann, reflecting the firm's strategic focus on enhancing its footprint in key Asian markets. The Shenzhen office will be led by Hew Kian Heong, who will co-lead the firm's practice in China with Linda Qiao who heads the Shanghai office.

In February 2025, Rajah & Tann appointed Ng Kim Beng as its new Managing Partner. In 2025, the Straits Times also reported that Rajah & Tann topped its list of the 100 top law firms in Singapore.

== Reputation ==
Rajah & Tann is regarded among the "Big Four" law firms in Singapore, and is also one of the largest law firms in Southeast Asia. The other three law firms in the Big Four are Allen & Gledhill, WongPartnership and Drew & Napier. In July 2011, the board of directors at Lex Mundi, a professional legal services network, had voted unanimously to admit Rajah & Tann as the exclusive member firm from Singapore.

The firm's partners and alumni are variously placed in prominent positions in Singapore. V. K. Rajah, the firm's former managing partner, went on to become a judge of the High Court in November 2004, and Judge of Appeal in April 2007. Steven Chong, who took over as sole managing partner, similarly went on to become a judge and is now serving on the Court of Appeal. Subsequently, Sundaresh Menon was appointed as a Judge of Appeal in August 2012, until his appointment as the current Chief Justice of Singapore in November 2012. In June 2014, V. K. Rajah was appointed as the Attorney-General of Singapore, where he remained until his retirement in January 2017. Another partner, Quentin Loh, was also appointed to the High Court in Singapore, and eventually became the President of the Singapore International Commercial Court and a judge on the Appellate Division. Additionally, Vikram Nair currently serves in the 13th Parliament of Singapore, while litigation partner Gregory Vijayendran was elected twice to serve as the president of the Law Society of Singapore from 2017 to 2021. A former partner, Murali Pillai, was also appointed to full-time political office in 2024, being appointed a Minister of State at the time.

A new practice group, Business Fundamentals, was launched in November 2015, to provide tailored legal advice to startups and SMEs in deal-making, dispute resolution and documentation. In October 2017, the firm adopted artificial intelligence technology developed by Luminance, a legaltech startup, to improve its due diligence processes for M&A transactions.

=== Awards and recognition ===
The Financial Times (FT) Asia Pacific Innovative Lawyers Awards 2018, held in Hong Kong, placed Rajah & Tann as one of the "Most Innovative Law Firms" in Asia-Pacific, and gave FT's "Standout" award to the firm for "Innovation in New Business and Service Delivery Models". Rajah & Tann has previously been the recipient of the "2016 FT Most Innovative Law Firm in ASEAN" award.

At the Asian Legal Business (ALB) South East Asia Law Awards in May 2018, Rajah & Tann was recognized as the "Law Firm of the Year" for the following sectors: labour and employment, maritime law, restructuring and insolvency law. In 2017, it was named "Corporate Citizenship Law Firm of the Year" by ALB.

The firm has additionally been ranked Band 1 by Chambers Asia Pacific 2018 for its practices in capital markets (securitisation and derivatives), employment, projects and energy, employment, restructuring/insolvency, shipping, and Technology, Media & Telecommunications (TMT). Furthermore, the firm was ranked in the top tier of the Legal 500 Asia Pacific 2018 edition for antitrust and competition, construction, dispute resolution, financial services regulatory, labour and employment, private wealth, projects and energy, restructuring and insolvency, shipping and TMT.

In 2017, Rajah & Tann received the 'Singapore National Law Firm of the Year' award from Chambers Asia-Pacific, marking its third win since 2012. The firm was named "Domestic Arbitration Firm of the Year" and recognized as the best in labour and employment at the Asia Law Pacific Dispute Resolution Awards 2017. The Asia Tax Awards 2017 extended recognition to Rajah & Tann as the "Singapore Tax Disputes & Litigation Firm of the Year".

In 2016, at the Asialaw Asia-Pacific Dispute Resolution Awards, the firm was named "Best Domestic Arbitration Firm of the Year", and at the International Legal Alliance Summit (ILAS) in 2015, Rajah & Tann was named "Best Asian Law Firm".

== Charitable activities ==
The Rajah & Tann Foundation was set up in early 2011 to give a portion of the firm's annual earnings to social causes. It is currently helmed by Rebecca Chew. The firm committed to an annual contribution of at least SGD 200,000. The foundation supports pilot projects focused on development of underprivileged children, providing necessary care and aid to the elderly, and offering assistance to disadvantaged groups and individuals. It is the first charity foundation to be set up by a law firm in Singapore.

Rajah & Tann is a participant of FLIP, a two-year pilot initiative launched by the Singapore Academy of Law in 2017. It aims to promote the adoption of technology by law firms and brings together lawyers, technology firms, investors, regulators and academics.

Rajah & Tann's charitable arm has received numerous accolades and awards, including being conferred the Champion of Good 2024 award by the National Volunteer & Philanthropy Centre.
