= Patrick Yu =

Hong Kong lawyer (1922–2019)

- 余叔韶
- Born: August 22, 1922; British Hong Kong
- Died: January 12, 2019 (aged 96); Hong Kong
- Education: University of Hong Kong; Merton College, Oxford
- Known for: Helped to establish the first law school in Hong Kong, "The Faculty of Law of the University of Hong Kong".

Chinese name
- Chinese: 余叔韶
Transcriptions
Standard Mandarin
- Hanyu Pinyin: Yú Shūsháo
Yue: Cantonese
- Jyutping: jyu4 suk1 siu4

Patrick Yu Shuk Siu (Chinese: 余叔韶; August 22, 1922 – January 12, 2019) was a trial and appellate lawyer in Hong Kong.

== Biography ==
Born into an intellectual Chinese family (father Yu Wa was an educator) in Hong Kong, with ancestry from Taishan, Guangdong, Yu was educated at home for many years before attending Wah Yan College Hong Kong, a prominent Jesuit high school in Hong Kong. In 1938, at the age of sixteen, he was admitted to the University of Hong Kong, where he studied in the arts program as a Government Scholar.

In 1941, shortly after the Pacific War had broken out, Yu served with British Naval Intelligence and was commissioned as an officer in the Intelligence Corps of the Army of the Republic of China. In 1945, Yu was awarded a Victory Scholarship by the Government of Hong Kong to continue his studies in England. He studied at Merton College, Oxford, from 1946 to 1948, and later passed his Bar Examination.

Jobless and almost penniless, Yu was forced to find himself a profession. Within a 10-month period, he familiarised himself with all the "niceties" of the English common law, studying in the Bar Library at Lincoln's Inn. In 1949, he passed the bar exam of England and Wales and practised briefly as a chancery barrister in London.

In 1950, Yu moved to Malaya for a short period to work in his uncle's (Yong Shook Lin) firm Shook Lin & Bok. He soon went back to Hong Kong, and in 1951 became the first Chinese person to be appointed Crown Counsel of that British colony. Yu resigned in 1953 and commenced a private practice.

He soon built up a sterling reputation as an advocate, and by the mid-1960s he had already become the top criminal lawyer in town. It was also during this time he helped to establish the first law school in Hong Kong, "The Faculty of Law of the University of Hong Kong". For that, he received an Honorary LLD degree from the University of Hong Kong.

In the 1970s, Yu was offered a judgeship on the Supreme Court of Hong Kong, an invitation he declined. Two similar offers were made during the decade. Yu declined both on the grounds of the discriminatory employment terms. Yu was also known for his refusal to apply to become Queen's Counsel, a mark of distinction envied by many practitioners in Hong Kong, the United Kingdom and in many other Commonwealth countries.

In 1983, after thirty years of private practice, Yu decided to retire. He became an autobiography author and story-teller, and has published two volumes of memoirs and stories since.

He became a life member of the Hong Kong bar association in 1994.

He is a cousin of Yong Pung How, former Chief Justice of Singapore, and his younger daughter is married to the younger son of Sir Ti Liang Yang, former Chief Justice of Hong Kong.

Yu died on 12 January 2019.

== Autobiography ==
- Tales from No. 9 Ice House Street, 2002 ISBN 962-209-580-1
- A Seventh Child and The Law, 2000 ISBN 962-209-524-0

== See also ==
- List of graduates of University of Hong Kong
