= T. T. Rajah =

Singaporean politician and lawyer

- Rajah in 1973

2nd Secretary-General of the People's Action Party
- In office 13 August 1957 – 3 September 1957
- Preceded by: Lee Kuan Yew
- Succeeded by: Lee Kuan Yew

Personal details
- Born: Thampore Thamby Rajah; 28 December 1919 British Ceylon
- Died: 13 March 1996 (aged 76) Singapore
- Other political affiliations: Barisan Sosialis (from 1961); People's Action Party (until 1957)
- Children: V. K. Rajah

Thampore Thamby Rajah (28 December 1919 – 13 March 1996), better known as T. T. Rajah, was a Singaporean politician and lawyer who served as Secretary-General of the People's Action Party for a short period of time in 1957 before joining the Barisan Sosialis in 1961.

== Early life ==
Rajah was born in British Ceylon on 28 December 1919. Prior to his arrival in Singapore, he lived in British Malaya for more than 20 years, gaining Singapore citizenship on 1 November 1957.

== Career ==
=== Politics ===
Rajah became a member of the People's Action Party's (PAP) 4th Central Executive Committee (CEC) following the party conference on 4 August 1957.

Shocked at losing half the seats in the CEC, several rank-and-file members of the PAP led by Lee Kuan Yew refused to take office. Rajah's appeals for Lee to remain in his post failed. On 13 August 1957, Rajah became the secretary-general, saying "they [he and his allies] had no choice but to hold positions". Alarmed by the leftist takeover, the Lim Yew Hock government arrested Rajah's leftist allies on 22 August 1957 but spared him.

Rajah resigned as the secretary-general "on health grounds" on 3 September 1957, having been in his post for only 21 days. He left the party on 11 October 1957 citing differences with Lee and accusing the latter of running a "one-man show".

In 1961, he joined the Barisan Sosialis founded by breakaway leftist members of the PAP, becoming its legal advisor.

In 1974, Rajah was arrested under the Internal Security Act with the Government alleging that he was part of the Malayan National Liberation Front, a Malayan Communist Party organisation. Rajah was released 18 months later on condition that he would not have any professional contact with political prisoners. In response to a government statement that he had disassociated himself from 'communist activities', Rajah replied that he had "not recanted and there's nothing to recant".

=== Law practice ===
In 1953, Rajah was called to the Singapore Bar.

In 1973, Rajah was suspended from practice for two years after handling private summons for several political prisoners which resulted in disclipinary actions by the Law Society.

In 1976, Rajah founded the legal firm, Tann Wee Tiong & T. T. Rajah, (now known as Rajah & Tann) with Tann Wee Tiong.

== Personal life ==
Rajah has a son, V. K. Rajah, who became a Judge of Appeal of the Supreme Court and then Attorney-General of Singapore.

Rajah died from a heart attack at 5:30am on 13 March 1996 while warded at the Mount Elizabeth Hospital, leaving behind his wife and two sons. His funeral was attended by former Barisan Sosialis leader Lee Siew Choh, while wreaths were sent by the Chinese ambassador and family of the late Malaysian Communist Party leader Eu Chooi Yip.

== Works cited ==
- Yap, Sonny; Lim, Richard; Leong, Weng K. (2010). Men in White: The Untold Story of Singapore's Ruling Political Party. Straits Times Press. ISBN 9789814266512.
