= Murder of Radika Devi Thayagarajah =

2008 murder of a pregnant Sri Lankan prostitute in Singapore

Radika Devi Thayagarajah
- Born: Radika Devi Thayagarajah; 8 January 1987; Sri Lanka
- Died: 3 September 2008 (aged 21); Geylang, Singapore
- Cause of death: Strangulation
- Occupation: Prostitute
- Known for: Murder victim
- Children: One unborn son (deceased); Two sons

On 4 September 2008, at a hotel in Geylang, Singapore's red-light district, the naked body of a 21-year-old Sri Lankan prostitute was found under the bed of one of its rooms. The victim, identified as Radika Devi Thayagarajah, was later found to be seven months' pregnant with a baby boy, and the child died as a result of his mother's death. Furthermore, Devi was speculated to have been killed at least 24 hours before her corpse was discovered by the hotel cleaners. Through police investigations, the police tracked down the man last seen booking the hotel room with Devi, and arrested the 20-year-old suspect Madhuri Jaya Chandra Reddy, who confessed to strangling Devi to death during an argument, which occurred due to Reddy asking to have sex with Devi a third time but Devi demanded him to pay more money. Originally charged with murder, Reddy was in the end sentenced to 17 years in jail and 12 strokes of the cane after he pleaded guilty to a reduced charge of manslaughter.

== Discovery of Devi's body ==
On 4 September 2008, at around 11am, two cleaners working at a hotel in Geylang, Singapore's red-light district, were carrying their usual task of cleaning one of the rooms when one of them (who wanted to sweep the underside of the bed) was unable to move the bed, finding it unusually heavy, and after finding bloodstains under the bed, the two men checked underneath and discovered the naked body of a deceased woman hidden under the bed. A police report was lodged at around 11.50pm, and the police classified the woman's death as murder through preliminary investigations.

According to a forensic pathologist Dr George Paul, who performed an autopsy on the victim, he found that the cause of death was manual strangulation. He also found that the victim was seven months' pregnant and the fetus was a boy, and the unborn child had also died due to his mother's death. Dr Paul also determined that the woman had died for at least 24 hours from the time when her corpse was found, as the body was getting discoloured. The victim's outer skin had begun to loosen due to early stages of decomposition, and discoloured veins were popping up under the skin.

The Geylang hotel case was one of the two murders to happen on that same day itself. In the other case of murder (six hours before the Geylang case), a Chinese national named Gong Hui Long was stabbed to death by his compatriot, who later went to his employer's flat to attack and stab the employer, who survived the stabbing. The killer, Luo Faming, was charged with murder on the same day as the perpetrator of the Geylang case but subsequently, Luo was given 24 years' jail for two reduced charges of manslaughter and attempted manslaughter. During the time when police conducted simultaneous investigations in the two separate murders (including the Geylang case), the killer of the Geylang case remained at large as of the time when Luo was arrested, although by the time Luo was charged, the suspect had been taken into custody.

== Police investigations ==
The Special Investigation Section of the Criminal Investigation Department (CID) were put in charge of the investigations, which were led by Assistant Superintendent of Police (ASP) Ang Leong Peng. ASP Ang instructed both Station Inspector (SI) Chris Lee and SI Erulandy Guruthevan to check with the hotel registrar and CCTV footage, and the police cordoned the room for eight hours while collecting the evidence, and the shocking discovery itself caused the people staying in the hotel to check out. The police found that based on the name list, an Indian construction worker named Samy Gopinath was the last person using the room, and at 2.30 am on 4 September (nine hours before the gruesome discovery), Samy checked in together with a woman using his work permit. After obtaining his particulars, the police approached Samy at his workplace in Jalan Kayu, and brought him in for questioning. Samy, who was not yet considered as a prime suspect at this point, denied that he committed any crime on the date he checked in, much less murder. Subsequently, after the autopsy revealed that the victim died for at least a day or more at the time of the discovery, and since Samy checked in the room just nine hours before the body was found, the police concluded that Samy was not the killer and he was innocent, and hence SI Guru released Samy after receiving the autopsy findings and order from ASP Ang.

The police searched around the room, and inside the bathroom, they discovered items hidden in a hole at the side of the bathtub. Among these items were a black handbag, a Sri Lankan passport, stub of a prepaid SIM card, a pair of jeans, a woman's blouse and female underwear. With the discovery of the passport, the police identified the victim as 21-year-old Radika Devi Thayagarajah, a Sri Lankan citizen born on 8 January 1987. Background information revealed that Devi had two more sons aged two and six at the time of the murder, and she was working as a sex worker in Geylang prior to her death.

After checking the CCTV footage and hotel registry, the police found that Devi checked in the hotel using her passport at 11.58pm on 2 September 2008, two days before her body was found. The footage revealed that Devi was together with a dark-skinned and Indian-looking man wearing a beige cap, a sighting confirmed by a witness. As the footage showed that Devi was using her mobile phone on one of the scenes, and the police did not find the phone among the belongings recovered, the police deduced that the killer, most likely the man with the beige cap, might have stolen the mobile phone. Phone records also showed that the phone belonging to Devi was still being used even after she died and prior to the phone calls made after her death, Devi's phone had last made two phone calls to one same phone number. The number was later traced to an Indian national named Madhuri Jaya Chandra Reddy, and he resembled the man captured wearing the beige cap by the hotel's CCTV cameras.

At around 5am the next day on 5 September 2008, ASP Ang and his team of officers went to a dormitory in Ama Keng Road (located at Lim Chu Kang), where Reddy was staying. According to the police records, the security officer was informed that the police were looking for Reddy to seek his assistance in investigations, and the officer was unable to provide them Reddy's block and room number, as only the manager, who was then not present, had the details. The security officer agreed to help the police to deactivate Reddy's dormitory access pass (which bore Reddy's work permit number) and to bring him to the office, where the police could arrest him. The plan eventually worked, as Reddy was unable to exit with his access pass, and he approached the security officer for help, and brought into the security office. This allowed the police to finally arrest Reddy after 22 hours of investigation. Devi's mobile phone and several pieces of gold items and jewelry were found in Reddy's possession, and soon after his arrest, Reddy confessed that he indeed murdered Devi.

After this, 20-year-old Madhuri Jaya Chandra Reddy was officially charged with murder on 6 September 2008. If found guilty of murder, Reddy would be sentenced to death under Section 302 of the Singaporean Penal Code.

== Account of the murder ==
The following was the official account of the murder of Radika Devi Thayagarajah, based on the confession of Madhuri Jaya Chandra Reddy and the evidence pieced together by the police.

Reddy, a native of Andhra Pradesh from India, first came to Singapore to work as a general worker on 28 November 2007. Reddy worked here for about ten months before mid-August 2008, when he noticed a missed call from an unknown number and when he dialed back, he heard the voice of a female caller, who introduced herself as Devi and asked if he could head fo Geylang and meet her; the caller "Devi" was none other than the victim Radika Devi Thayagarajah. Reddy correctly assumed that Devi was a prostitute based on the flirtatious way she spoke to him on the phone, but he stated that he was sleeping and could not go. Reddy would call her back in the following few weeks, and on 2 September 2008, at 7pm, the eve of the murder, Reddy asked Devi if he could meet her at Geylang, and it was negotiated that Reddy would pay Devi $S50 for one round of sex. More than three hours later, Reddy and Devi met each other at a hotel along Lorong 18 in Geylang, and after Devi finished her dinner at 11.45pm, the pair discussed on the payment and while Devi told Reddy that he had to pay S$150 for sex in addition to S$40 for renting a room for four hours. After some bargaining, Devi agreed to pay the S$40 room charge instead.

At around midnight, the duo went into the hotel (the same place where she met Reddy) and Devi booked one room using her Sri Lankan passport, and inside the room, Reddy and Devi had two rounds of sex, and by 2am on 3 September 2008, Reddy asked Devi to have sexual intercourse with him a third time. However, Devi wanted Reddy to pay her more if he wanted to do it, but Reddy refused. Devi and Reddy fiercely argued over this and Devi threatened to call her agent to come and beat Reddy up. Reddy managed to snatch away the phone and when Devi rushed towards him with her fists clenched, Reddy retaliated by closing his hand around Devi's neck, squeezing it and pinned her down on the bed to stop her from attacking him or taking back her phone. During the struggle, which lasted for a couple of minutes, Devi was unable to put up resistance due to her pregnancy and she died as a result of strangulation.

Upon realizing that Devi had died, Reddy frantically tried to hide the body to cover up Devi's death. Reddy chose to hide the naked body of Devi under the bed, but the bed was not lying flat due to the body underneath, and noticing that there was a layer of fabric covering the base. Reddy slashed open the fabric and found an empty space between the bed top and the base, and after removing Devi's gold chain and two gold rings, Reddy pushed the corpse into the space itself, and laid the bed down. After hiding the body, Reddy left the hotel by the spiral staircase and roamed the streets for about ten minutes before he returned to the room. When he entered the bathroom, he discovered Devi's belongings and hid them at an opening at the base of the bathtub, and covered up the hole. Reddy also stole two gold bangles and a gold chain from Devi's bag and also kept her handphone, and he pushed the bag and Devi's clothes inside the hollow space of the bathtub. Knowing that he was seen checking into the room with a girl, Reddy decided to avoid suspicion by looking for another girl and bring her back to the hotel.

Reddy roamed around the streets of Geylang and managed to find another sex worker, whom he brought back to the same hotel. Reddy informed the hotel receptionist that he would be extending his stay for another hour, and he later had sex with the other prostitute inside the same room where he killed Devi. He and the other sex worker left the hotel and checked out at 4.20pm. Reddy wandered around the area before he returned his Ama Keng Road dormitory at daybreak to go to bed, and he would use Devi's phone to call his home at Andhra Pradesh. The next day on 4 September 2008, Reddy went to Geylang and found the police officers outside the hotel where Devi died, and he speculated that Devi's body was found, and before he could make plans to leave for India, Reddy was identified by the police and arrested for murdering Devi just 22 hours after the discovery of her body.

== Trial and sentencing of Reddy ==
On 11 January 2010, about a year and four months after his arrest, 21-year-old Madhuri Jaya Chandra Reddy stood trial at the High Court for the killing of Radika Devi Thayagarajah. By then, the prosecution reduced the charge of murder to one of culpable homicide not amounting to murder, equivalent to manslaughter in the law of Singapore, and this allowed Reddy to escape the death penalty for murdering Devi. Reddy pleaded guilty to the reduced charge and therefore convicted. Judicial Commissioner Steven Chong, the trial judge, adjourned sentencing until 14 January 2010 for Reddy to make his mitigation plea and for both sides to prepare their submissions on sentence. The stipulated sentence for manslaughter was either life imprisonment or up to 20 years' jail, with a possible fine or caning.

On 14 January 2010, during Reddy's sentencing trial, Reddy's lawyer Low Cheong Yeow argued in mitigation that his client was unaware of Devi's pregnancy and he was “neither the initiator nor aggressor” in the altercation, which arose from a dispute over another round of sex. He stated that Devi had tried to assault Reddy by moving towards him with clenched fists, and Reddy only retaliated because of this threat. Low said that Reddy was liable to be repatriated after his release from prison and the likelihood of Reddy's future actions having effects on the local populace was remote.

The prosecution, however, sought a sentence of 18 to 20 years' jail for Reddy, stating that the death of Devi was the result of a "cold-blooded and callous" killing. Deputy Public Prosecutor (DPP) Gillian Koh-Tan pointed out that Reddy had grossly overreacted to Devi's threats and he took undue advantage over a "defenceless woman" who was seven months' pregnant and unable to put up resistance to protect herself and her unborn son, which led to the tragic loss of two lives, and even after snatching Devi's mobile phone, Reddy had the choice to not continue argue with Devi and leave the place instead of killing her. DPP Koh also directed the court's attention to the post-killing actions of Reddy, who took meticulous and systematic steps to cover up his tracks by stealing the valuables of Devi. hiding or disposing of her remaining belongings and even engaged the services of another prostitute, with whom he had sex in the same room where Devi was killed, and this reinforced the prosecution's claim of Reddy's "utter lack of contrition" behind the murder.

On the same day, Judicial Commissioner Steven Chong delivered his verdict. He found that the killing of Devi was far disproportionate to the threats she posed to Reddy, and he also made note that Reddy was fully conscious of his actions. Judicial Commissioner Chong also admonished Reddy for his utter lack of remorse, stating that it was demonstrated through his acts of misappropriating the items of the deceased and having sexual intercourse with another sex worker on the same bed he shared with Devi before he killed her just hours before engaging the services of the other prostitute. Having considered the aggravating factors of the case, and noting that two lives were ultimately lost in this case, Judicial Commissioner Chong sentenced Reddy to 17 years' imprisonment and 12 strokes of the cane.

== Aftermath ==
During the same week when Reddy was sentenced for killing Devi, the case shed light on the phenomenon of foreign women working as illegal prostitutes in Geylang, and the presence of both violence and pregnancy were the job hazards which these women often faced in their line of work. Additionally, in 2011, when a similar case of a dead woman's body was found in a hotel occurred in Geylang, the 2008 killing of Devi once again gained attention.

The move to drop the murder charge and convict Reddy of manslaughter was controversial to a certain extent, as some members of the public felt that it was not an appropriate legal outcome due to the heinous nature of the crime. An opinion piece, titled “The uneven nature of Singapore's justice system”, was published by the Asian Correspondent a day after Reddy's sentencing and the writer Ben Bland expressed his concern over the uneven nature of Singapore's justice system, given that Reddy was responsible for the cold-blooded and ruthless murder of a pregnant woman but ultimately sentenced to 17 years in prison with caning after the prosecution stopped pushing for a murder charge, and escaped the gallows in contrast to Yong Vui Kong, a Malaysian youth who was given the death penalty for trafficking 47g of diamorphine. Bland found that it was relatively lenient for Reddy to not face the murder charge that would have warranted a mandatory death sentence, as well as the maximum sentence of life imprisonment for manslaughter, and this particular legal outcome posed an extreme disparity between Reddy and Yong, the latter who was sentenced to death for smuggling a small amount of drugs into Singapore. The writer clarified that despite his opinion, he did not wish to cast aspersions on Singapore's legal system and refrained from making judgements on Reddy's defence claims at trial due to him not being present in the court proceedings of Reddy's case, and he felt that the leniency accorded to Reddy, whom Bland described as a “callous killer”, should also be equally extended to a "naive, low-level drug mule" like Yong. Three years later in 2013, after the changes to the death penalty laws in Singapore, Yong's death sentence was commuted to life imprisonment and 15 strokes of the cane on the grounds that Yong was only acting as a courier and had cooperated with the authorities in tackling drug crimes, which were among the requirements for an alleged drug trafficker to fulfill in order to get a life sentence in lieu of death.

In March 2011, Singaporean crime show Crimewatch re-enacted the murder of Radika Devi Thayagarajah, and it depicted the investigations that led to the arrest and conviction of Madhuri Jaya Chandra Reddy.

In June 2022, a local writer Foo Siang Luen wrote a real-life crime book titled Justice Is Done 2, which recorded some of Singapore's high-profile murder cases solved by police throughout the years between 2005 and 2016, and the 2008 case of Radika Devi Thayagarajah's death was recorded as one of these cases covered in the book.

== See also ==
- List of major crimes in Singapore
