= WongPartnership =

Law firm in Singapore

WongPartnership LLP
- Headquarters: 12 Marina Boulevard Level 28 Marina Bay Financial Centre Tower 3 Singapore 018982
- Key people: Ng Wai King (Managing Partner)
- Date founded: 1992
- Founder: Wong Meng Meng; Sundaresh Menon; Alvin Yeo; Dilhan Pillay Sandrasegara
- Company type: Limited liability partnership
- Website: www.wongpartnership.com

WongPartnership is a Singaporean law firm. It is regarded as one of the Big Four law firms in Singapore, alongside Allen & Gledhill, Rajah & Tann, and Drew & Napier. In 2021, it was ranked as the second-largest law firm in Singapore by size, with 111 partners and 223 associates.

== History ==
In 1992, Wong Meng Meng & Partners was formed by a team of 11 lawyers, including Wong Meng Meng, Sundaresh Menon, Dilhan Pillay Sandrasegara, and Alvin Yeo. The firm was later renamed to WongPartnership in 2008.

In 2000, a proposed deal for the firm to partner with Clifford Chance in a joint law venture (JLV) fell through, owing in part to the resignation of senior partner Lee Suet-Fern, who went on to start her own firm and JLV with Shearman & Sterling. The deal had started off poorly, with the proposal having had to be resubmitted owing to various errors. WongPartnership's was the first of the seven initial JLVs to end.

In 2015, it began a partnership with Singapore Management University to provide funding and mentorship for the law school's mooters.

In 2013, Rachel Eng and Ng Wai King were appointed joint managing partners of the firm.

In March 2016, it was announced that Eng's new role would be deputy chairperson, alongside Tan Chee Meng. At the time, the chairperson of the firm was Alvin Yeo. Following the move, the sole managing partner of the firm was Ng Wai King.

In July 2018, it was reported that Rachel Eng would be leaving her role as partner and deputy chairperson of the firm to set up a new firm, Eng & Co LLC, which would be part of the PwC global legal network.

In September 2022, it was announced that Chou Sean Yu, the head of the firm's litigation and dispute resolution practice, had been appointed as deputy managing partner and would succeed the current managing partner, Ng Wai King, when Ng retires. Although the firm's policy is for partners to retire at 55 and Ng turned 57 in 2022, the firm made special provisions for Ng to continue leading the firm as managing partner beyond the standard retirement age.

== Notable lawyers ==
=== Current lawyers ===
- Lam Chung Nian
- Simon Tay, legal academic
- Tan Choo Leng
- Tan Cheng Han SC

=== Former lawyers ===
- Alvin Yeo, founding partner and former Member of Parliament
- Andre Francis Maniam, High Court Judge
- Christopher de Souza, Deputy Speaker and Member of Parliament
- Dilhan Pillay Sandrasegara, founding partner and CEO of Temasek Holdings
- Lee Suet-Fern, daughter-in-law of Lee Kuan Yew
- Sundaresh Menon, founding partner and Chief Justice of the Supreme Court
- Wong Meng Meng, founding partner

== See also ==
- Lawyers in Singapore
