= Joint law venture =

Singaporean law firm entity

In Singapore law, a joint law venture (JLV) is a law firm joint venture formed from a constituent local law firm and an offshore counterpart.

== History ==
The first JLVs were licensed on 10 August 2000. Of the seven partnerships, all but one have since dissolved. The frequent failures of JLVs have led to criticism of the Singapore government's conceptualisation and implementation of the JLV.

The first JLVs to be licensed
Joint Law Venture	Local Firm	Offshore Firm	Year of Dissolution	Ref
Linklaters Allen & Gledhill	Allen & Gledhill	Linklaters	2012	
Freshfields Drew & Napier	Drew & Napier	Freshfields	2007	
Allen & Overy Shook Lin & Bok	Shook Lin & Bok	Allen & Overy	2009	
(Dissolved before operation)	Wong Partnership	Clifford Chance	2000	
Hogan Lovells Lee & Lee	Lee & Lee	Hogan Lovells	Ongoing	
Orrick Helen Yeo	Helen Yeo & Partners	Orrick Herrington & Sutcliffe	2003	
White & Case Colin Ng	Colin Ng & Partners	White & Case	2002	

== Current JLVs ==
List of operating JLVs
Joint Law Venture	Year of Establishment	Ref
Mayer Brown PK Wong & Nair	2022	
Simmons & Simmons JWS	2016	
Clyde & Co Clasis	2013	
Duane Morris & Selvam	2011	
Baker Mckenzie Wong & Leow	2001	

== Current formal law alliances ==
Formal law alliance	Ref
Stephenson Harwood	
