= Dilhan Pillay Sandrasegara =

Singaporean lawyer and CEO

- Born: 1963 (age 62–63); Singapore
- Education: Anglo-Chinese School (Independent)
- Alma mater: National University of Singapore (LLB); University of Cambridge (LLM)
- Title: Executive Director & CEO of Temasek Holdings

Dilhan Pillay Sandrasegara (Tamil: தில்ஹான் பிள்ளை சந்திரசேகர) (born 1963) is a Singaporean lawyer who has been the executive director and chief executive officer (CEO) of Temasek Holdings since 1 October 2021.

He co-founded the law firm WongPartnership in 1992 and led it as managing partner from 2007 before joining Temasek in September 2010.

In August 2025, Temasek announced a reorganization under which Sandrasegara would additionally become chairman of Temasek International, Temasek Global Investments, Temasek Singapore, and Temasek Partnership Solutions from 1 April 2026.

== Early life and education ==
Born in Singapore, Sandrasegara attended Anglo-Chinese School (Independent) before graduating from the National University of Singapore in 1988 with a Bachelor of Laws (LLB) degree. He subsequently went on to complete a Master of Laws (LLM) degree at the University of Cambridge in 1990.

== Career ==
Sandrasegara, together with Wong Meng Meng and nine other lawyers founded the Singaporean law firm, WongPartnership in 1992, though it was named Wong Meng Meng & Partners at the time of its founding. He was a mergers and acquisitions lawyer. He became the managing partner in 2007, after Wong retired.

He then joined Temasek in September 2010 and held several roles such as group head for investment, portfolio management and enterprise development. Before becoming the CEO of Temasek Holdings, he was the CEO and executive director of Temasek International, the investment arm of Temasek Holdings, a role he took on in April 2019. Prior to that, he also served as Head, Americas for Temasek Holdings, and was based in New York.

He succeeded Ho Ching as the CEO of Temasek Holdings in October 2021. He also serves on the boards of National Research Foundation (Singapore) and Enterprise Singapore. In August 2024, he was named to the Future Economy Advisory Panel.

Temasek announced on 28 August 2025 that Sandrasegara would become chairman of Temasek International, Temasek Global Investments, Temasek Singapore and Temasek Partnership Solutions from 1 April 2026, succeeding Lee Theng Kiat as chairman of Temasek International. Sandrasegara said the reorganisation was intended to test the next generation of leaders and prepare them to lead the company.

== Personal life ==
Sandrasegara is married to Chan Su Chan. He is a member of the International Bar Association, the Inter-Pacific Bar Association, and the Singapore Institute of Directors.
