= Sundaresh Menon =

Singaporean lawyer (born 1962)

The Honourable Sundaresh Menon SC
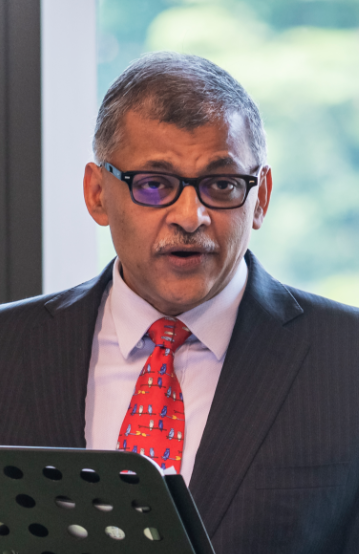
- Menon speaking at the SMU School of Law in 2019

4th Chief Justice of Singapore
- Incumbent
- Assumed office 6 November 2012
- President: Tony Tan; Halimah Yacob; Tharman Shanmugaratnam
- Preceded by: Chan Sek Keong

Justice of the Court of Appeal of Singapore
- In office 1 August 2012 – 5 November 2012
- Appointed by: Tony Tan

6th Attorney-General of Singapore
- In office 1 October 2010 – 25 June 2012
- Appointed by: S. R. Nathan
- Preceded by: Walter Woon; Koh Juat Jong (acting)
- Succeeded by: Steven Chong

Judicial Commissioner of the Supreme Court of Singapore
- In office 3 April 2006 – 2 April 2007
- Appointed by: S. R. Nathan

Personal details
- Born: 26 February 1962 (age 64) State of Singapore
- Education: National University of Singapore (LLB); Harvard University (LLM)

Sundaresh Menon SC (born 26 February 1962) is a Singaporean lawyer and judge who has served as the fourth Chief Justice of Singapore since 2012 after being appointed by president Tony Tan. He is the first Singapore-born Chief Justice and the second to have previously served as the Attorney-General of Singapore after Chan Sek Keong. Menon has played a prominent role in the development of Singapore's legal landscape, particularly in the areas of commercial law and legal technology, and is recognised for his efforts to strengthen the rule of law and judicial cooperation across Asia. He was a founding partner of law firm WongPartnership, and was also a partner at Shook Lin & Bok, Rajah & Tann, and Jones Day.

Educated at the National University of Singapore and Harvard Law School, Menon began his career in private practice and was appointed Senior Counsel (SC) in 2008. He held senior positions in several prominent law firms before being appointed Judicial Commissioner in 2006 and subsequently as Attorney-General (AG) in 2010. He was appointed as Judge of Appeal in 2012 before assuming the office of Chief Justice later that year.

As Chief Justice, Menon has overseen significant reforms in legal education, court processes, and professional ethics. He has also advocated for the internationalisation of Singapore law, including the establishment of the Singapore International Commercial Court (SICC) in 2015. His speeches and writings have contributed to academic discourse on transnational justice, legal pluralism, and the evolving role of the judiciary in a globalised legal environment.

On 17 July 2026, PMO announced that Menon will retire from Chief Justice by 27 February 2027, a day after his 65th birthday, and will be succeeded by Sushil Nair.

== Early life and education ==
Born in Singapore, Menon graduated from the National University of Singapore in 1986 with a Bachelor of Laws degree with first-class honours. He subsequently completed a Master of Laws degree at Harvard Law School in 1991.

== Career ==
Menon started his career at Shook Lin & Bok as a legal assistant in 1987, and became a partner in 1990. In 1992, together with Wong Meng Meng and Alvin Yeo, Menon co-founded WongPartnership, one of the largest law firms in Singapore, and remained a partner in the law firm until 1995. He then joined Rajah & Tann as a partner and served as its Head of Projects & Infrastructure Group until 2003, and thereafter joined Jones Day as a partner until 2006.

Menon served a one-year term as a Judicial Commissioner of the Supreme Court between 2006 and 2007. Returning to legal practice with Rajah & Tann after, he was appointed Senior Counsel on 5 January 2008, and became its managing partner in August 2009. Menon was appointed Attorney-General on 1 October 2010, where he served until 25 June 2012. He was subsequently appointed a Justice of the Court of Appeal on 1 August 2012. On 6 November 2012, he was appointed as the fourth Chief Justice of Singapore by then-president Tony Tan. He is the first Chief Justice to be born in Singapore.

Menon has served as Deputy Chairman of the Singapore International Arbitration Centre, a member of the Senate of the Singapore Academy of Law, and Chairman of the Advisory Board for the Singapore Management University School of Law.

== Notable judgments ==
As a Judicial Commissioner, Judge of Appeal, and Chief Justice, Menon has delivered the following notable judgments:

- Public Prosecutor v Lew Syn Pau [2006] 4 SLR(R) 210, [2006] SGHC 146 (as a JC)
- Re Shankar Alan s/o Anant Kulkarni [2007] 1 SLR(R) 85, [2006] SGHC 194 (as a JC)
- Tan Chui Lian v Neo Liew Eng [2007] 1 SLR(R) 265, [2006] SGHC 203 (as a JC)
  - Affirmed by the Court of Appeal in Ong Chai Soon v Ong Chai Koon [2022] 2 SLR 457, [2022] SGCA 36
- Goh Nellie v Goh Lian Teck [2007] 1 SLR(R) 453, [2006] SGHC 211 (as a JC)
- Hong Leong Singapore Finance Ltd v United Overseas Bank Ltd [2007] 1 SLR(R) 292, [2006] SGHC 205 (as a JC)
- Lee Hsien Loong v Review Publishing Co Ltd [2007] 2 SLR(R) 453, [2007] SGHC 24 (as a JC)
- L W Infrastructure Pte Ltd v Lim Chin San Contractors Pte Ltd [2013] 1 SLR 125, [2012] SGCA 57 (as a JA)
- Yong Kheng Leong v Panweld Trading Pte Ltd [2013] 1 SLR 173, [2012] SGCA 59 (as a JA)
- Dorsey James Michael v World Sport Group Pte Ltd [2013] 3 SLR 354, [2013] SGCA 31 (as CJ)
- Wee Kim San Lawrence Bernard v Robinson & Co (Singapore) Pte Ltd [2014] 4 SLR 357, [2014] SGCA 43 (as CJ)
- Zoom Communications Ltd v Broadcast Solutions Pte Ltd [2014] 4 SLR 500, [2014] SGCA 44 (as CJ)
- Citiwall Safety Glass Pte Ltd v Mansource Interior Pte Ltd [2015] 1 SLR 797, [2014] SGCA 61 (as CJ)
- SGB Starkstrom Pte Ltd v Commissioner for Labour [2016] 3 SLR 598, [2016] SGCA 27 (as CJ)
  - Which effectively departed from Chiu Teng @ Kallang Pte Ltd v Singapore Land Authority [2014] 1 SLR 1047, [2013] SGHC 262
- Nam Hong Construction & Engineering Pte Ltd v Kori Construction (S) Pte Ltd [2016] 4 SLR 604, [2016] SGCA 42 (as CJ)
- Attorney-General v Ting Choon Meng [2017] 1 SLR 373, [2017] SGCA 6 (as CJ)
- Law Society of Singapore v Udeh Kumar s/o Sethuraju [2017] 4 SLR 1369, [2017] SGHC 141 (as CJ)
- Nagaenthran a/l K Dharmalingam v Public Prosecutor [2019] 2 SLR 216, [2019] SGCA 37 (as CJ)
- Asia Development Pte Ltd v Attorney-General [2020] 1 SLR 886, [2020] SGCA 22 (as CJ)
- Tan Seng Kee v Attorney-General [2022] 1 SLR 1347, [2022] SGCA 16 (as CJ)
  - A decision which was criticised by the previous Chief Justice, Chan Sek Keong SC in an extra-judicial article: "Equal Justice and the Prosecutorial Power" (2022) 34 SAcLJ 256
- Roszaidi bin Osman v Public Prosecutor [2023] 1 SLR 222, [2022] SGCA 75 (as CJ)
- Law Society of Singapore v Ravi s/o Madasamy [2023] SGHC 112 (as CJ)

Legal offices
Preceded by Chan Sek Keong	Chief Justice of Singapore; 2012-2027	Succeeded by Sushil Nair
