= Abdul Rahim Shapiee =

Singaporean drug convict (1977–2022)

- Born: c. 1977; Singapore
- Died: 5 August 2022 (aged 44–45); Changi Prison, Singapore
- Occupation: Uber driver
- Status: Executed
- Criminal charge: Drug trafficking
- Penalty: Death

Abdul Rahim bin Shapiee (c.1977 – 5 August 2022) was a Singaporean Uber driver who received capital punishment in Singapore for trafficking of 41.24g of heroin. After his arrest on 3 August 2015, Abdul Rahim, who was also charged with consuming drugs, was convicted in March 2018 and despite the prosecution's acknowledgement of his role as a courier and himself having provided substantive assistance to the authorities, Abdul Rahim still received the death penalty since he had performed duties that exceeded that of a mere drug runner. After failing to overturn his sentence through appeal, Abdul Rahim was hanged on 5 August 2022. One of his two accomplices, Ong Seow Ping, was also arrested and executed for drug trafficking, and the other was serving a life sentence for the same offence.

== Background and case ==
=== Personal life ===
Abdul Rahim bin Shapiee was born to parents Shapiee bin Yahya and Zubedah binte Mohd in 1977. He had a brother Muhammad Hanafiee and sister Norhafizah, and he also had several cousins (including two of Chinese descent), uncles and aunts. He worked as an Uber driver prior to his arrest, and had been arrested several times for drug consumption.

=== Arrest ===
Abdul Rahim was arrested on 3 August 2015 after the Central Narcotics Bureau (CNB) monitored him and raided his flat. The search in his flat yielded 14 packets and three straws of diamorphine, and the total amount of the diamorphine weighed not less than 41.24g. Abdul Rahim admitted to possessing these drugs for trafficking and confessed that some of the drugs were intended for his own consumption. During his time in custody, Abdul Rahim was contacted by his accomplice Ong Seow Ping, who did not know about his capture. Under the police's instructions, Abdul Rahim contacted Ong for an arranged delivery of one pound of the drugs, which allowed the police to arrest him as well after he was lured out of his home to deliver the drugs. Ong's flat was also searched and the police found 51.73g of diamorphine in his possession. The arrests of Abdul Rahim and Ong led to both of them being charged for drug trafficking, which carries the death penalty in Singapore.

A third accomplice, Nuraiin binte Rosman, was arrested at the same location together with Abdul Rahim. She was sentenced to life imprisonment in a separate trial since she was acting as a mere courier at the time of the offence. She later became one of the prosecution's witnesses at Abdul Rahim's trial.

== Trial and sentencing ==
=== High Court proceedings and conviction ===
The joint trial of Abdul Rahim Shapiee and Ong Seow Ping lasted between 28 September 2017 and 15 March 2018 at the High Court. Abdul Rahim stated in his defence that he intended for a large amount of the diamorphine for his consumption, and stated that he was threatened by the police investigators to confess or that his family and wife would be prosecuted as well for his offence. The High Court however, rejected that the police had threatened Abdul Rahim since the fears harboured by Abdul Rahim were self-perceived and not possible to happen, and also, Abdul Rahim's claim of his high intake of diamorphine (half a packet) was disputed because of the case evidence showing that Abdul Rahim normally smoked one straw every two days, and based on the calculations through the amount of diamorphine he possessed, Abdul Rahim's supply would last him for nearly three years. Abdul Rahim had also admitted that he consumed methamphetamine to make up for the lowered intake of diamorphine he adopted from July 2014 onwards.

Besides, Abdul Rahim only earned a monthly income of less than S$2,000 through his driver job, and roughly $800 a week working for his father's business. This worked out to around S$5,200 a month. He did not work as a driver since July 2014 and it reduced his income, and given the high costs he incurred from purchasing his drugs, his low income would not have allowed him to afford the drugs unless he made up for it with the huge profit he gained from drug trafficking (as proven by the proceeds he yielded from trafficking). As such, Abdul Rahim was found guilty of capital drug trafficking on 15 March 2018 and convicted as charged.

=== Death penalty ===
Although the prosecution acknowledged Abdul Rahim as a courier and issued him a certificate of substantive assistance for cooperating with the authorities in arresting Ong and their disruption of drug-related activities, the trial judge Valerie Thean found that Abdul Rahim was not acting as a mere courier, as there was evidence to show that he repacked the drugs and gained payment for his deliveries, which went beyond a courier's duties of transporting the drugs. For this aspect, 41-year-old Abdul Rahim Shapiee was deemed ineligible for the alternative sentence of life imprisonment, and hence, he was sentenced to death on 15 March 2018, the same date of his conviction. 45-year-old Ong Seow Ping also received the death sentence on the same date of Abdul Rahim's sentencing after the prosecution did not certify him as a courier.

Abdul Rahim was not the first certified courier to be sentenced to death. Before his case, 54-year-old Singaporean Hamzah Ibrahim was the first to receive the death sentence in 2017 for trafficking 26.29g of heroin despite receiving the certificate for providing substantive assistance, due to the High Court judging that Hamzah had performed duties exceeding those of a courier.

== Appeal processes ==
=== 2020 appeal hearing ===
On 5 March 2020, Abdul Rahim lost his appeal against the sentence, with the Court of Appeal determining that the trial judge's findings in his case were correct and without error.

=== Racial discrimination lawsuit ===
In August 2021, an appeal was made by 17 Malay death row inmates, including Abdul Rahim himself, against their respective sentences on basis of alleged racial discrimination. It was revealed that between 2010 and 2021, Malays made up 66 of the 120 prosecutions for drug trafficking, where over 76% of them were sentenced to death. 50 out of 77 people sentenced to death between 2010 and 2021 were revealed to be Malays. Abdul Rahim and the 16 other prisoners thus submitted that the prosecution of suspects over capital cases were laced with racial discrimination and differential treatment based on the alleged "over-representation" of minorities (especially the Malays) on Singapore's death row. However, the lawsuit was dismissed by the courts on 2 December 2021, because there was no evidence of differential treatment towards the inmates based on their ethnicity and race, and these allegations should be considered as an abuse of the court processes due to them being potentially casting aspersions on the integrity and reputation of Singapore's laws. Abdul Rahim's two lawyers (including M Ravi) were both ordered to pay S$10,000 in costs for filing the lawsuit.

== Death warrant and response ==
On 29 July 2022, Abdul Rahim Shapiee's death warrant was finalized and it was mailed to his sister. Abdul Rahim's execution was scheduled to take place on 5 August 2022. Ong Seow Ping, Abdul Rahim's accomplice, was also scheduled to hang on the same date and time as Abdul Rahim.

There were eight executions carried out within the past five months prior to the date when both Abdul Rahim and Ong were due for execution, with the latest being the double executions of 34-year-old Malaysian Rahmat Karimon and his 46-year-old Singaporean co-accused co-conspirator Zainal bin Hamad on 2 August. There were appeals made locally and internationally for clemency in the cases of Ong and Abdul Rahim, and among them were the human rights experts of the United Nations, who condemned Singapore for their use of the death penalty and asked that a moratorium should be placed on capital punishment and all upcoming executions in Singapore be cancelled in favour of eventual abolition. The rise in executions in Asian countries (especially the military junta-led Myanmar) had led to Singapore being named as one of the few countries that the United Nations criticized for continuing the practice of capital punishment despite the growing international trend of the abolition of capital punishment.

== Final appeal process ==
=== Lawsuit against Attorney-General ===
On 3 August 2022, two days before he was set to hang, Abdul Rahim became one of the 24 death row prisoners to file a lawsuit against the Attorney-General of Singapore, and they brought forward claims that there were miscarriages of justice in their cases as they were denied their access to legal counsel and had their preparations of appeal hindered, which was influenced by the recent cases of inmates having to argue in their appeals without any lawyers to represent them. They claimed their access to counsel was obstructed due to the strict court orders and penalties issued against any lawyers who made appeals without merit or abused the court process, which led to a supposed climate of fear among lawyers and made them opt to not represent the inmates facing imminent execution. However, these allegations were rejected by the High Court as the lawsuit was an abuse of process and "plainly unsustainable and unmeritorious", and the courts stated that there may have been "perfectly valid and legitimate reasons" why lawyers declined to take up the inmates' cases apart from costs orders, and hence, the basis that lawyers were threatened by the court penalties to not take up these cases and argue the appeals that contained no merit were not supported at all by concrete evidence.

On 4 August 2022, the Court of Appeal rejected the follow-up appeal by the prisoners against the High Court's verdict. Abdul Rahim also failed to obtain a stay of execution in another appeal. Ong, on the other hand, did not appeal at all.

=== Sister's complaint ===
Besides the lawsuit, Abdul Rahim's sister Norhafizah filed a complaint to the courts that the prison authorities had not carried out instructions from her brother who, on 25 July 2022, asked for the necessary documents to file an appeal to delay his hanging and review his case, which she claimed had allegedly led to the legal application being blocked and not being heard earlier before the scheduled execution. However, the Singapore Prison Service (SPS) refuted the claims and made a media statement. They stated that on the date when Abdul Rahim claimed he approached the authorities, the records showed that the prison officers did not receive news of Abdul Rahim or any other prisoner asking for the relevant forms to make any legal application, which proves that Abdul Rahim's allegations against the prison authorities were not true at all.

Also, when two unidentified inmates approached the officers on 28 July, they already received advice from the officers that the inmates should seek such documents and legal advice from only the courts but not prison officers to facilitate the preparation of their planned appeals and applications. Hence the alleged hindrance of the inmates' application also did not stand.

== Execution ==
On 5 August 2022, 45-year-old Abdul Rahim Shapiee and 49-year-old Ong Seow Ping were both hanged at Changi Prison at dawn. They were the ninth and tenth prisoners to be executed during the COVID-19 pandemic in Singapore.

The Singapore Prison Service confirmed that the executions of Ong and Abdul Rahim were being carried out, and the Central Narcotics Bureau released a statement, stating that both were “accorded full due process under the law, and were represented by legal counsel throughout the legal proceedings”.

In the year 2022 itself, a total of eleven executions, including Abdul Rahim's, had been officially carried out in Singapore, all for drug offences.

== Aftermath ==
The International Commission of Jurists (ICJ) condemned the government of Singapore for executing Abdul Rahim and Ong. They also criticized the lack of legal representation by death row inmates in appealing against their executions, and stated that there was a violation of the prisoners' basic right to counsel and there should be measures taken to prevent such situations from occurring. Similarly, the International Bar Association's Human Rights Institute (IBAHRI) also criticized Singapore for the rising trend of executions in the aftermath of Abdul Rahim's death sentence and called for an immediate moratorium on executions to ensure the abolition of capital punishment in Singapore.

On 8 September 2022, both the Ministry of Law (MinLaw) and Ministry of Home Affairs (MHA) expressed support for the decision to execute Abdul Rahim and condemned both the ICJ and IBAHRI for inaccurately presenting the facts of his case, stating that every prisoner equally had a right to legal representation in court but this right should not be an excuse for abusing the court process, since Abdul Rahim, whose trial lasted from 2016 to 2018, submitted an appeal merely hours before his execution and the Court of Appeal also stated that his appeal had no merit and thus refused to stay his execution. They also stated that the penalties issued against lawyers like M Ravi for filing baseless appeals were perfectly justified should their misconduct and abuse of court processes were substantially true. About both the ICJ's and IBAHRI's other allegations of racial discrimination of the death penalty by Singapore, both MinLaw and MHA harshly criticized both groups for casting aspersions on the city-state's use of the death penalty, as ethnicity and socio-economic status play no part in how law enforcement agencies discharge their duties, the prosecutorial decisions of the Public Prosecutor and in the decisions of the courts. Both ministries stated that the death penalty was applied for the most serious crimes in Singapore, which also includes drug trafficking due to the harmful effects of drugs on abusers and families). They strongly asserted that every country has a sovereign right to decide their judicial system and no international consensus exists about whether capital punishment for drugs constitutes a breach of international law or not, and respect should be given to such rights in addition to urging the IBAHRI and ICJ to get their facts right.

In light of Abdul Rahim's execution, Pritam Singh, opposition leader of Parliament and chairman of Workers' Party, wrote to Singapore newspaper Today to express his support for the death penalty for drug crimes in Singapore and the execution of drug traffickers. Besides his opinion that the death penalty should remain due to high public support and its deterrence effect, Singh cited that there should be changes made to rectify some inevitable shortcomings about the courts' need to determine the extent of one's cooperation with the authorities during investigations of suspected drug trafficking before sentencing the said person to death or life imprisonment.

== See also ==
- Abdul Kahar Othman
- Nagaenthran K. Dharmalingam
- Norasharee Gous
- Kalwant Singh Jogindar Singh
- Nazeri Lajim
- Capital punishment in Singapore
- List of major crimes in Singapore
- Misuse of Drugs Act (Singapore)
