= Steven Chong =

Singaporean judge (born 1957)

The Honourable Steven Chong SC
- 庄泓翔
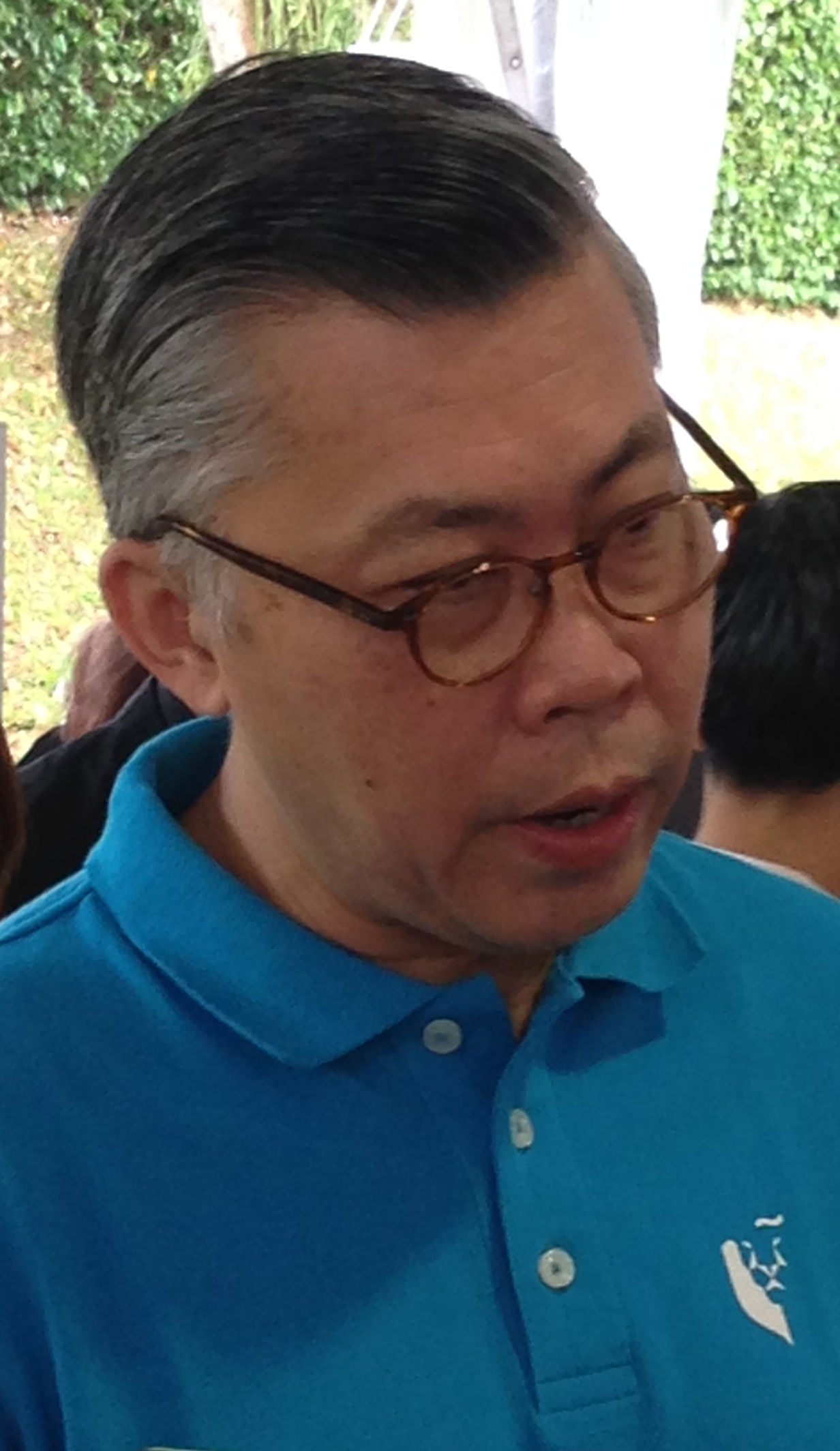
- Chong in 2014

Justice of the Court of Appeal of Singapore
- In office 1 April 2017 – 22 September 2026
- Appointed by: Tony Tan

Judge of the High Court of Singapore
- In office 25 June 2014 – 31 March 2017
- Appointed by: Tony Tan

7th Attorney-General of Singapore
- In office 25 June 2012 – 24 June 2014
- Appointed by: Tony Tan
- Preceded by: Sundaresh Menon
- Succeeded by: V. K. Rajah

Judge of the High Court of Singapore
- In office 1 June 2010 – 21 June 2012
- Appointed by: S. R. Nathan

Judicial Commissioner of the Supreme Court of Singapore
- In office 1 October 2009 – 31 May 2010
- Appointed by: S. R. Nathan

Personal details
- Born: 22 September 1957 (age 69) Colony of Singapore
- Education: National University of Singapore (LLB)

Steven Chong
- Simplified Chinese: 庄泓翔
Transcriptions
Standard Mandarin
- Hanyu Pinyin: Zhuāng Hóngxiáng

Steven Chong Horng Siong SC (born 22 September 1957) is a Singaporean jurist who served as a judge of the Court of Appeal of Singapore from 2017 to 2026. He had previously served as the seventh attorney-general of Singapore between 2012 and 2014, and a judge of the High Court of Singapore between 2010 and 2012, and again between 2014 and 2017.

== Early life ==
Chong graduated from the National University of Singapore with a Bachelor of Laws degree in 1982.

In that same year, Chong, together with Davinder Singh, V. K. Rajah and Jimmy Yim, won the Philip C. Jessup Cup.

Chong was admitted as an advocate and solicitor of the Supreme Court in 1983. He was appointed Senior Counsel in January 1998, Judicial Commissioner in October 2009 and Supreme Court Judge in June 2010.

== Career ==
Chong started his legal practice at Drew & Napier, where he spent 14 years and built up his legal career from an associate to the joint Managing Partner. He then spent 12 years in Rajah & Tann and was its Senior Partner and then Managing Partner until his appointment to the Supreme Court Bench. He was a leading commercial lawyer during his practice and argued many cases in court. He was also a senior member of the Singapore arbitration community and participated in arbitration as both a counsel as well as an arbitrator. He is an accredited Arbitrator of the Singapore International Arbitration Centre and the Singapore Chamber of Maritime Arbitration. Chong was also Iceland's Honorary Consul to Singapore from 2003 to 2009.

Chong was appointed Attorney-General on 25 June 2012, succeeding Sundaresh Menon. In April 2014 it was announced that he would return to Singapore's High Court at the conclusion of his two-year term, to be succeeded by Judge of Appeal V. K. Rajah.

During his tenure as judicial commissioner, Chong heard the case of prostitute killer Madhuri Jaya Chandra Reddy, an Indian national who strangled a pregnant sex worker to death in a Geylang hotel after they argued over the payment of the prostitute's services. Reddy was originally charged with murder before the charge was reduced to manslaughter through a plea bargain between the defence and prosecution. Chong found that Reddy's act of killing the victim was disproportionate to the threat she may pose to his safety, and he also made note that Reddy was fully conscious of his actions. Chong stated that Reddy clearly was unremorseful of his actions, given that he misappropriated the items of the deceased and having sexual intercourse with another sex worker in the same room where he killed the victim, whose body was hidden under the bed. Chong sentenced Reddy, then 21 years old, to 17 years' imprisonment in January 2010.
