= Ahmed Salim (murderer) =

Bangladeshi painter put to death in Singapore for murder (1989–2024)

- Born: 1 January 1989; Bangladesh
- Died: 28 February 2024 (aged 35); Changi Prison, Singapore
- Cause of death: Execution by hanging
- Occupation: Painter
- Status: Executed
- Motive: Intention to kill due to anger over the victim's alleged infidelity
- Conviction: Murder under Section 300(a) of the Penal Code (one count)
- Criminal charge: 1st charge: Murder of 34-year-old Nurhidayati Wartono Surata
- Penalty: Death

Ahmed Salim (1 January 1989 – 28 February 2024) was a Bangladeshi painter who was convicted of murdering his Indonesian girlfriend Nurhidayati Wartono Surata on the evening of 30 December 2018 at a hotel in Geylang in Singapore. According to Ahmed, Nurhidayati met with Ahmed and expressed her intention to break up with him due to his arranged marriage and her finding a new boyfriend. Ahmed planned to kill Nurhidayati during that meeting itself if she rejected his request to break up with her new boyfriend.

Although Ahmed's defence counsel submitted medical evidence to prove that Ahmed's mental state was impaired as a result of adjustment disorder during the killing, the High Court determined that Ahmed had a clear intention to commit premeditated murder and never suffered from an abnormality of the mind when killing Nurhidayati. Hence, Ahmed was convicted of murdering Nurhidayati under Section 300(a) of the Penal Code and condemned to death on 14 December 2020. As of 2024, Ahmed Salim was the most recent person to be sentenced to death for murder by the courts of Singapore.

Ahmed was hanged on 28 February 2024, after his appeal to the Court of Appeal and clemency plea to the President of Singapore were both dismissed.

== Biography ==
Ahmed Salim was born in Bangladesh on 1 January 1989. He was likely the only child and son of his family.

After completing his education, Ahmed moved from Bangladesh to Singapore in 2010 to seek employment. He was working as a painter as of December 2018.

== Relationship with Nurhidayati ==
In May 2012, while working in Singapore, Ahmed Salim first met Nurhidayati Wartono Surata, an Indonesian citizen who had come to Singapore that same year to work as a maid. Nurhidayati, born 1984, hailed from the Indramayu regency of West Java, where she lived with her mother Warsem and stepfather Muradi. Nurhidayati was married with one son before she divorced her husband, seven years after they married in an unknown year. As of December 2018, Nurhidayati was working for a family that resided in Serangoon, which was the third family she had worked for since her arrival in Singapore in 2012.

Ahmed and Nurhidayati became romantically involved after they met and Nurhidayati's family were aware of their relationship. In November 2017, five years after they first met, the couple agreed to get married in December 2018. Ahmed was devoted to Nurhidayati, and regarded her as his wife despite not being officially married.

In May or June 2018, Nurhidayati met Shamim Shamizur Rahman, a Bangladeshi who worked as a plumber in Singapore, and became attracted to him. Upon getting wind of Nurhidayati's relationship with Shamim, Ahmed confronted her and subsequently, he contacted his mother and a friend to help him find a wife. Eventually, Ahmed's mother found a potential wife for him, and the marriage was arranged to take place in February 2019.

Eventually, sometime in July or August 2018, Ahmed and Nurhidayati reconciled and resumed their relationship in spite of Nurhidayati being reminded of Ahmed's arranged marriage. However, while they resumed their routine meetings on Sundays, the couple's relationship became fraught with arguments regarding Nurhidayati's continued meetings with Shamim, and at one point, during one of these quarrels, Ahmed was so enraged that he used a towel to cover Nurhidayati's mouth, before he released Nurhidayati after she struggled; Nurhidayati later apologized to Ahmed over this.

Three months later, in October or November 2018, Nurhidayati met Hanifa Mohammad Abu, a Bangladeshi and work permit holder who worked as a fitter in Singapore. Not long after, Nurhidayati fell in love with Hanifa and became his girlfriend. Shortly after they had begun dating, Nurhidayati told Hanifa about Ahmed and informed him about Ahmed's arranged marriage in Bangladesh. She assured Hanifa that she would end her relationship with Ahmed; Hanifa and Nurhidayati continued dating despite all this.

On 9 December 2018, Ahmed suspected that Nurhidayati was once again seeing another man. Nurhidayati did not deny it and admitted she had become Hanifa's girlfriend, and asked Ahmed to go back to Bangladesh to marry his fiancée. Although Ahmed asked Nurhidayati to meet him again on 23 December with the view of persuading her not to break up, Nurhidayati once again expressed that she wished to end her relationship with Ahmed in view of his upcoming marriage.

== Golden Dragon Hotel murder ==
A CCTV footage scene that captured Ahmed Salim and Nurhidayati entering the hotel prior to the latter's murder.

Ahmed Salim, then 29 years old, despaired over his relationship issues with Nurhidayati, especially after she decided to break up with him. He then planned to persuade Nurhidayati not to break up with him, and should that fail, he would kill her, prior to meeting Nurhidayati on 23 December 2018. However, Nurhidayati agreed to meet him on 30 December and not the week earlier. On 30 December, Ahmed emptied his bank account of his savings of SGD$1,150, and bought a rope for the purpose of strangling Nurhidayati as he was aware that Singapore law did not allow people to carry weapons in the public.

On the late evening of 30 December 2018, Ahmed met up with Nurhidayati at the Golden Dragon Hotel in Geylang. After having sex in the hotel room, Ahmed pleaded with Nurhidayati to break up with Hanifa and hoped to reconcile their relationship. However, Nurhidayati was firm with her stance to end their six-year relationship, and refused to bow down to Ahmed's threat of killing her. As a result, Ahmed used a towel to strangle Nurhidayati before changing to the rope he brought along to strangle her. He had looped the rope around her neck a few rounds before tying it into a knot and tighten the rope further. As a result of the strangulation, 34-year-old Nurhidayati Wartono Surata died.

In the aftermath of the killing, Ahmed took Nurhidayati's money (SGD$30 in cash), mobile phone and EZ-link card, and left the hotel shortly after applying for a two-hour extension of his stay. He also contacted his roommate Khalid Md Abdul, seeking his help to remit SGD$1,000 in cash to his father, and also told him and some other colleagues he would be returning to Bangladesh. He also notified his employer that he would be returning to Bangladesh.

== Investigations ==
The body of Nurhidayati was discovered by a hotel receptionist Lee Peng Yuan at 10.15pm, after Lee could not get a response from Ahmed's hotel room when the time for the room is up. After the hotel contacted the police and hospital, paramedics arrived and they pronounced 34-year-old Nurhidayati Wartono Surata dead at 11:02pm.

According to Paramedic Sergeant Nabilah binte Sadali, she observed that Nurhidayati had a rope tied around her neck and she was bleeding from her nose and left ear, and her face was swollen. Forensic pathologist Dr Lee Chin Thye of the Health Sciences Authority performed the autopsy on the body, and he wrote in his medical report that he found ligature marks around Nurhidayati's neck, consistent with the rope around her neck, which was wound four times around her neck and tied with a knot. He also did not rule out that a towel had also been used to strangle the victim before the rope, and Lee concluded that the causes of death were both strangulation and cervical spine injury.

The next day, on 31 December 2018, about 14 hours after killing Nurhidayati, 29-year-old Ahmed Salim, who by then was listed as a suspect, was arrested after he arrived at his employer's office, in response to the employer's request to meet Ahmed to discuss his upcoming return to Bangladesh. Ahmed was charged with murder on 2 January 2019.

At the time she died, Nurhidayati was survived by her then-11-year-old son, her stepfather and mother. Her family were shocked to hear from the Indonesian Embassy in Singapore about her death, and they expressed their sadness over Nurhidayati's death. She was scheduled to return to Indonesia on 15 January 2019, about two weeks after the date of her death. Nurhidayati's family also said she had a wish to buy a new house for herself and her son, after she had bought land and a new house for her stepfather and mother with the income she had earned as a maid in Singapore. Warsem had once advised her daughter to move to Hong Kong to work for another family but Nurhidayati refused to out of loyalty to her Singaporean employer. Representatives of the Indonesian Embassy in Singapore also expressed that they would continue to receive updates from the Singapore Police Force and make arrangements to bring Nurhidayati's body back to her hometown in West Java after the completion of the autopsy. Her remains were interred in the Muslim Cemetery in West Java, Indonesia where she grew up.

== Trial ==
On 15 September 2020, one year and nine months after he killed Nurhidayati, 31-year-old Ahmed Salim stood trial at the High Court for committing Nurhidayati's murder. Deputy Public Prosecutor (DPP) Hay Hung Chun and his three colleagues Senthilkumaran Sabapathy, Soh Weiqi and Deborah Lee were appointed the trial prosecutors, while Judicial Commissioner Mavis Chionh Sze Chyi was appointed the trial judge. Ahmed was represented by a defence counsel of three lawyers, consisting of Eugene Thuraisingam and his two law firm associates Chooi Jing Yen and Hamza Malik.

During his trial, Ahmed did not deny that he had indeed killed Nurhidayati, but he denied the prosecution's contention that he had had the intention to cause her death. He submitted that on that night, he was hurt by Nurhidayati's alleged insulting remarks that her new boyfriend Hanifa was better than he was, both financially and in bed. Ahmed even at one point expressed that he wished he could die since the death of Nurhidayati had made him lose the will to live. Ahmed's lawyers also submitted the medical report of defence psychiatrist Dr Ken Ung Eng Khean to show that Ahmed's mental responsibility was substantially impaired by his adjustment disorder at the time of the offences, making him qualify for a defence of diminished responsibility. However, Dr Christopher Cheok, a government psychiatrist from the Institute of Mental Health, found that while Ahmed may have adjustment disorder, his symptoms were not severe enough for him to suffer from an abnormality of the mind at the time he killed Nurhidayati, and the prosecution also argued based on Ahmed's confession to the police that he had intentionally strangled Nurhidayati with the purpose to cause her death and as a result of his anger over Nurhidayati's infidelity, and the prosecution even pointed out that his claims of losing his self-control under Nurhidayati's alleged provocative words were not true, and sought a guilty verdict of murder.

On 14 December, Judicial Commissioner Mavis Chionh delivered her verdict. In her judgement, Judicial Commissioner Chionh found that even before the day of the killing, Ahmed already developed a plan to murder Nurhidayati if she refused to leave her new boyfriend and return to him, and the signs of him emptying his bank account and preparing a rope to kill the victim were telling and corroborative of his intention to kill, and his admissions to the police about his premeditation to cause Nurhidayati's death also supported this contention. The judge also rejected Ahmed's claim that Nurhidayati had insulted him and thus gravely provoked him to kill her due to Ahmed only mentioning this for the first time during the trial after more than one year since his arrest. Ahmed's supposed suicidal thoughts were also not accepted by the trial judge.

Judicial Commissioner Chionh also did not accept the defence's psychiatric evidence that Ahmed's mental responsibility had been substantially impaired by his adjustment disorder, and determined that he was fully capable of exercising his self-control and making coherent decisions. She also noted that Ahmed's conduct prior, during and after the murder demonstrated that his crime was done out of "premeditation, cogent planning and methodical execution."

Therefore, Judicial Commissioner Chionh convicted 31-year-old Ahmed Salim of murder under Section 300(a) of the Penal Code and condemned him to death. Under Section 300(a), the offence of murder was defined as one that carried the intention to kill and with pursuant to Section 302(1) of the Penal Code, the death penalty was the mandatory sentence for a Section 300(a) murder offence upon conviction.

After the end of sentencing, Thuraisingam confirmed that Ahmed intended to appeal the trial decision.

Ahmed was one of the two people to receive a death sentence for murder in Singapore during that year of 2020. A month before him, on 12 November 2020, former property agent Teo Ghim Heng was found guilty of murdering his pregnant wife and four-year-old daughter back in 2017, and the High Court imposed two mandatory death sentences on Teo after convicting him under Section 300(a) of the Penal Code for killing the two victims with intent to cause death.

== Appeal ==
On 12 October 2021, Ahmed Salim submitted a motion to the Court of Appeal, seeking to overturn his Section 300(a) murder conviction. Ahmed's lawyer Eugene Thuraisingam argued in the appeal that his client's defences of diminished responsibility and sudden and grave provocation should be ruled valid against the murder charge, and he also argued that the trial judge had erred in finding that Ahmed had intended to commit premeditated murder with intent to kill, and hence the Section 300(a) murder conviction should be downgraded to a lesser degree of murder that did not warrant a mandatory death sentence; should the charge of murder not carry the intention to kill (under either Sections 300(b), 300(c) or 300(d) of the Penal Code), the punishment would be either the death penalty or life imprisonment with caning. On the same date of hearing, the appellate court's three-judge panel, consisting of Chief Justice (CJ) Sundaresh Menon and Judges of Appeal Andrew Phang and Chao Hick Tin, reserved judgement.

On 19 January 2022, the Court of Appeal delivered their judgement, dismissing Ahmed's appeal against his conviction. CJ Menon, who read out the judgement in court, stated that the three judges agreed with Judicial Commissioner Chionh's trial findings that Ahmed possessed the intention to kill based on the steps he had taken to prepare the murder plot and the manner of his execution of the plan, and they also disbelieved Ahmed's claims that Nurhidayati had insulted him and caused him to be provoked into killing her.

The three judges also stepped aside to emphasise in their verdict that even if the charge an accused faced in court were one of intentional murder (with intent to kill) that carried the mandatory death penalty, the defence of diminished responsibility could still be used to rebut the charge and reduce it to manslaughter if successful. Still, looking at Ahmed's case, the three judges found that his adjustment disorder had not substantially impaired his mental faculties at the time he committed the offence of premeditated murder, and instead, they found that Ahmed was "rational, had self-control and was fully able to comprehend events at the critical moment when he finally decided to kill (the victim)", demonstrating his perfect ability to exercise self-control and rational thought up till the time he killed 34-year-old Nurhidayati Wartono Surata. Therefore, Ahmed's appeal was dismissed.

As a final recourse to evade the gallows, Ahmed petitioned to the President of Singapore for clemency, and if successful, his death sentence would be commuted to life imprisonment. The last death row inmate to be granted clemency was Mathavakannan Kalimuthu, whose death sentence for a gangster's murder was converted to life in prison in April 1998 under the approval of then-President Ong Teng Cheong. However, Ahmed's clemency petition was dismissed on an unknown date.

== Execution ==
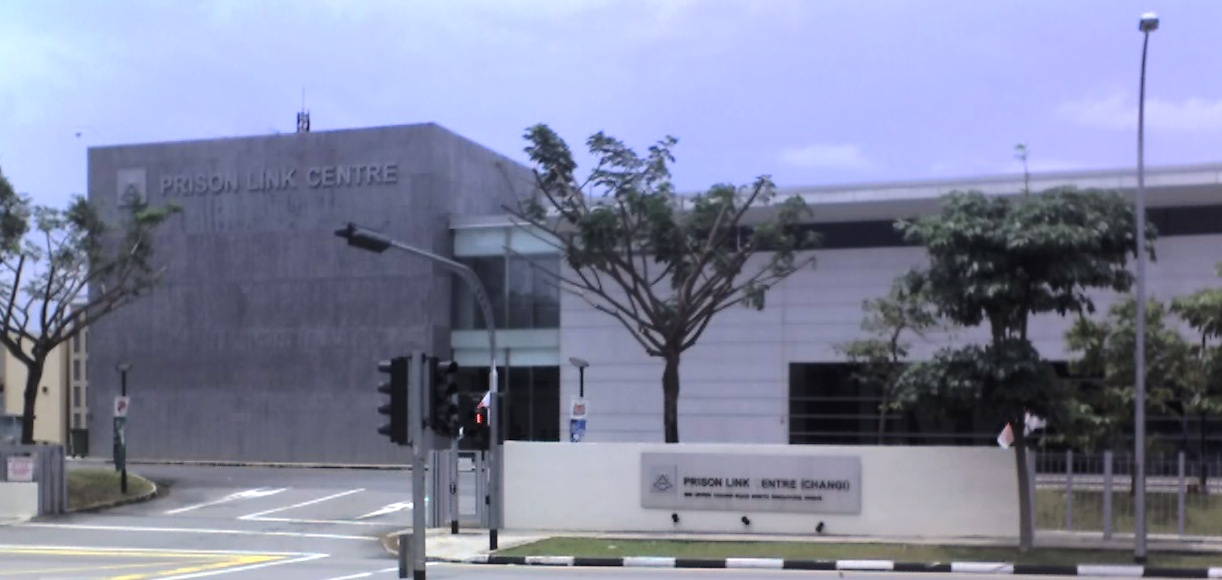
Changi Prison, where Ahmed was hanged in 2024 for Nurhidayati's murder.

On 28 February 2024, 35-year-old Ahmed Salim was hanged in Changi Prison at dawn. Prior to his execution, the last executions for murder in Singapore had been carried out in 2019, when two convicted murderers (one of whom was Micheal Anak Garing) were executed. Ahmed's lawyer Eugene Thuraisingam said that he and his associates had tried their utmost to defend Ahmed in his trial, but respected the state's decision to execute him. Thuraisingam had earlier argued that Ahmed should be given a life sentence in view of his psychiatric disorder.

The Singapore Prison Service confirmed that Ahmed was the first person to be executed in Singapore in 2024, and the Singapore Police Force, in a media statement that confirmed the news of the hanging, stated that he had been accorded full due process and had been represented by counsel throughout the legal process, adding that the death penalty was reserved for the worst of crimes that affected either the victim or society in general.

Ahmed was the 17th person to be put to death in Singapore since the resumption of executions in March 2022 during the COVID-19 pandemic, and all the 16 criminals executed before him were convicted of drug trafficking. Ahmed's hanging left two more convicted killers - Teo Ghim Heng and Iskandar Rahmat - on death row as of February 2024, and it was believed that at least 47 people were also on death row awaiting execution for drug trafficking in Singapore as of the time when Ahmed was executed. The Singaporean authorities also clarified that the COVID-19 pandemic was not the reason behind the two-year pause on executions, but due to the inmates still in the process of appeal or other lawsuits related to their sentences, and only when all available avenues of appeal were exhausted, like in Ahmed's case, the execution could be scheduled and carried out. Ahmed would remain as the sole individual hanged in Singapore in 2024 for the next five months before the hanging of drug trafficker Moad Fadzir Mustaffa on 2 August 2024, whose execution was confirmed by authorities through a media statement despite the omission of his name out of respect for his family's need for privacy.

Human rights group Transformative Justice Collective, which released a statement about Ahmed's death sentence, revealed that his remains would be repatriated to the Bangladeshi city of Dhaka under the arrangements of the Singaporean authorities. Ahmed reportedly did not receive visits from his family and friends throughout his incarceration on death row in Singapore, and Ahmed, who was notified of his death warrant two weeks prior, was resigned to his fate and he decided not to appeal to stay or oppose his execution, which therefore went ahead as scheduled. The group criticized the execution of Ahmed, describing the death penalty as "one of the most cold-blooded and premeditated forms of murder", and also stated that they opposed the death penalty in all cases, without exception. They even highlighted that Ahmed's life should have been spared in light of his adjustment disorder, which they claimed was sufficient to impair his mental responsibility at the time of the murder.

In response to Ahmed's execution, the European Union condemned the Singapore government for the decision to execute Ahmed, and they stated that the death penalty was a cruel and unusual punishment that defied a person's right to life and pushed for Singapore to abolish capital punishment.

== See also ==
- Capital punishment in Singapore

Executions carried out by Singapore
| Preceded by Mohamed Shalleh Abdul Latiff 3 August 2023 | Ahmed Salim; 28 February 2024 | Succeeded by Moad Fadzir Mustaffa 2 August 2024 |
