= Jarius =

Jarius is a masculine name, in use both as a given name and a family name. Notable people with the name include:

- Jarius Hayes (born 1973), American football player
- Jarius Holmes (born 1986), American soccer player
- Jarius Monroe (born 2000), American football player
- Jarius Wright (born 1989), American football player
- Jarius Wynn (born 1986), American football player

== See also ==
- Jairus (disambiguation), a similar name
- Jarrius Jackson (born 1985), American-Italian professional basketball player
- L'Jarius Sneed (born 1997), American football cornerback
