= Thuraisingam =

Thuraisingam is a surname. Notable people with the surname include:

- Eugene Thuraisingam (born 1975), Singaporean lawyer
- Sanjayan Thuraisingam (born 1969), Tamil Canadian cricketer.
