= Yair (given name) =

Yair (Hebrew: יאיר) is a Hebrew given name. Jair is a variant. It may refer to:

- Jair (biblical figure) or Yair, a judge in the Bible's Book of Judges
- Yair Bacharach (1639–1702), a rabbi in Germany
- Yair Davidovitz (born 1945), Israeli Olympic sport shooter
- Yair Golan (born 1962), Israeli politician and former general in the Israel Defense Forces
- Yair González (born 2002), Argentine footballer
- Yair Kless (born 1940), Israeli violinist and professor
- Yair Lapid (born 1963), Israeli politician, former Prime Minister of Israel
- Yair Lotan (born 1973), Israeli actor
- Yair Mena (born 2000), Colombian footballer
- Yair Michaeli (1944–2024), Israeli Olympic competitive sailor
- Yair Netanyahu (born 1991), son of Israeli prime minister Benjamin Netanyahu
- Yair Nossovsky (born 1937), Israeli footballer
- Yair Pantilat (1939–2022), Israeli Olympic runner
- Yair Rodriguez (born 1992), Mexican mixed martial artist
- Yair Rosenblum (1944–1996), Israeli composer
- Yair Sprinzak (1911–1999), Israeli scientist and Member of Knesset
- Yair Tauman (born 1948), Israeli professor and businessman
- Yair Tzaban (born 1930), Israeli politician
- Yair Vardi (1948–2025), Israeli dancer and choreographer
- Yair Wertheimer (born 1955), Israeli tennis player

== See also ==
- Yahir, Mexican singer
- Ben Yair (surname)
- Jair (given name)
- Jairus (disambiguation)
