= Jair =

Jair may also refer to:

== People ==
- Jair (given name)
- Jair (footballer, born 1921), Brazilian attacking midfielder Jair da Rosa Pinto
- Jair (footballer, born 1953), Brazilian attacking midfielder Jair Gonçalves Prates
- Jair (Cape Verdean footballer) (born 1974), Cape Verdean forward Anselmo Emiliano Carvalho Gomes Ribeiro
- Jair (footballer, born 1988), Brazilian striker Jair Eduardo Britto da Silva
- Jair (footballer, born 3 August 1994), Brazilian midfielder Jair Tavares da Silva
- Jair (footballer, born 26 August 1994), Brazilian midfielder Jair Rodrigues Júnior
- Jair Cunha (born 2005), also known simply as Jair, Brazilian centre-back Jair Paula da Cunha Filho

== Other uses ==
- Jair (biblical figure), a judge in the Hebrew bible
- Journal of Artificial Intelligence Research (JAIR), open access peer-reviewed scientific journal
- Kia Awyu, or Jair, a language native to Papua, Indonesia

== See also ==
- Jaire Alexander (born 1997), American former National Football League player
