= Jairus (disambiguation) =

Jairus is a biblical name associated with the story of the raising of Jairus' daughter.

== People ==
- Jairus Ang, the English name of Singaporean robbery victim Ang Jun Heng
- Jairus Aquino (born 1999), Filipino actor
- Jairus Birech (1992–2025), Kenyan steeplechase runner
- Jairus Byrd (born 1986), American football player
- Jairus C. Fairchild (1801–1862), American politician and businessman
- Jairus Lyles (born 1995), American basketball player
- Jairus Edward Neal (1818–1882), American banker and politician
- Jairus C. Sheldon (1827–1905), American politician from Illinois

== Others ==
- Peter Jairus Frigate, fictionalized version of the science fiction author Philip José Farmer in the Riverworld series
- Papilio jairus, an alternate name for the Asian butterfly Taenaris urania

== See also ==
- Jair (given name)
- Yair (given name)
