= Woodlands double murders =

2017 family murders in Singapore

- Woodlands double murder victims Choong Pei Shan (age 39) and her daughter Teo Zi Ning (age 4)
- Date: 20 January 2017; 9 years ago
- Location: Woodlands, Singapore
- Outcome: Teo Ghim Heng hanged in Changi Prison on 16 April 2025
- Deaths: Choong Pei Shan (39); Teo Zi Ning (4); Unborn son
- Injuries: None
- Convicted: Teo Ghim Heng
- Verdict: Guilty
- Convictions: Murder under Section 300(a) of the Penal Code (two counts)
- Sentence: Death

The Woodlands double murders were the murders of pregnant housewife Choong Pei Shan (Chinese: 钟佩珊; pinyin: Zhōng Peìshān) and her daughter Teo Zi Ning (Chinese: 张梓宁; pinyin: Zhāng Zǐníng) by her husband Teo Ghim Heng (Chinese: 张锦兴; pinyin: Zhāng Jǐnxīng) on 20 January 2017. The murders, which took place in their Woodlands flat in Singapore, were supposedly committed due to Teo and his wife arguing with each other about their financial difficulties. During the argument, Teo strangled Choong with a towel before he killed their daughter, Zi Ning. The murder of Choong, in turn, made Teo responsible for murdering his unborn son; Choong was six months' pregnant when her husband killed her.

For the next eight days, Teo tried to hide the murders from his family and attempted to kill himself. On 28 January 2017, the first day of Lunar Chinese New Year, Teo's crime was discovered. This occurred because of a police report and a house visit made by Choong's brother, who was suspicious about the absence of his sister and niece. Teo was later arrested, tried, and found guilty of the murders. Teo was sentenced to death, and later lost his appeal and clemency to president. He was executed by hanging in Changi Prison on 16 April 2025.

The Woodlands family murder case was considered one of the most significant familicides (including the Chin Swee Road child death) in Singapore in recent years.

== Background ==
Teo Ghim Heng, alias Eric Teo, was a Singaporean property agent who married Choong Pei Shan on 7 December 2009. This was not his or Choong's first marriage. The couple tried to have children, but Choong suffered from several miscarriages. In 2013, Choong gave birth to their first child, a daughter named Zi Ning. During his time as a property agent, Teo earned between $10,000 and $15,000 a month, and he was considered successful in his career. Many who knew him described Teo as a good father and committed husband, and a good, efficient worker who mixed well with others in his workplace. According to Teo's younger brother, Teo Nam Thia, and Teo's mother, Cheong Goik Keow, Teo did not confide in his family about personal problems.

Sometime in 2014, Teo caught Choong in bed with another man named Mark Mu, with whom Choong had been having an affair. He forgave her because of their daughter, whom he at first suspected might not be his biological child. In 2015, the property market cooled, and Teo's income declined. Teo was experiencing difficulty in managing his family's finances, and did not pay Zi Ning's school fees for months. He also incurred debts from gambling, as well as borrowing money from his friends, colleagues, and financial institutions. The debt culminated into $120,000 by January 2017. In November 2016, he started working as a sales coordinator with a monthly salary of $1,500.

Choong became pregnant with their second child, confirmed to be a son, and his expected delivery date was in May 2017. Teo and Choong, in view of their financial troubles, initially wanted to abort the child in November 2016, but decided to not do so after some counselling. Teo contemplated selling his car and flat to pay off the debts. He reportedly asked Choong to take a part-time job to help manage the family expenses, but she declined.

== Murders ==
On the morning of 20 January 2017, four-year-old Zi Ning was getting ready to go to school. Teo, who received notifications from the principal to pay Zi Ning's overdue school fees worth $1,700, knew that he would not be able to pay the fees. He was afraid of embarrassment if Zi Ning were asked to leave, and so told her to change out of her school uniform and watch television.

When Choong heard about the problem, she and Teo began to argue about their financial situation. The couple had been arguing over finances since 13 January, when Teo's creditors came to their home to demand payment. This incident made Choong realize the extent of their debt. When Teo was brought to trial for the murder of his wife and daughter, he stated that during the argument, Choong belittled him for being a useless husband. She then asked Zi Ning to look at her father as she called him useless. During the argument, Teo claimed that he could not contain his rage and used a towel to strangle his wife, who was six months pregnant. The baby she carried died as well. Teo then strangled his daughter in the same manner, after he allegedly told Zi Ning to join her mother before he would join them.

=== Post-killing days and discovery ===
For the next eight days, Teo busied himself with preparations to take his own life. He surfed the internet for ways to commit suicide. He attempted to kill himself in various ways, such as slitting his wrists and consuming insecticide, as well as consuming hundreds of paracetamol tablets, but these methods were unsuccessful. He penned four suicide notes to his family under his and Choong's names to make it look like he and Choong agreed to kill themselves with their child given their stress over the family finances. During this period, when phone calls came from family and Zi Ning's school asking him where Choong and Zi Ning were, Teo said that they were busy or ill, and unable to come. Teo indicated that he and his wife and daughter could not go for weekly visits to his family's and in-laws' houses for dinner, and tried to delay the plans for the Chinese New Year visits. Teo changed his wife's Facebook page (where Choong often posted their daughter's photos) to make it look like she was still alive.

On 28 January 2017, the first day of the Chinese New Year, Choong's brother Choong Mun Chen (Gordon), became suspicious of his sister's absence. Gordon tried calling Teo, but Teo gave the excuse that he could not come over until 11 am. Teo later called in the afternoon through a payphone, saying that he had been driven out of the house by Choong after an argument, and tried to prevent his family and in-laws from visiting his flat in Woodlands. During the evening, Gordon, the eldest of the Choong family's three adult children and only son, appeared at Teo's flat after failing multiple times to contact his sister. Accompanied by his other brother-in-law, Chris Lam Kwek Fah, Gordon called for his sister to come out, but there was no response. It was then that he forced open a window and smelled a pungent odor.

The smell came from the smoke of a fire Teo had lighted earlier to destroy all evidence of his crimes. Teo attempted to use the same fire to burn himself to death. Police and firefighters were contacted and they arrived at the flat. Teo eventually told people at the scene that his wife and daughter were dead, and it was his fault.

=== Arrest and murder charges ===
Teo was arrested, and the charred corpses of the victims were found in the bedroom; he was taken to hospital for treatment of his overdose of paracetamol tablets. On 30 January 2017, Teo was charged with first-degree murder for the double homicide of his wife and daughter. First-degree murder under Section 300(a) of Singapore's Penal Code dictates an offence of murder committed with an intention to kill, and this offence carries the mandatory death penalty in Singapore. Forensic pathologist George Paul later tested the corpses and confirmed that both Zi Ning and her mother died from either strangulation or smothering. Teo was remanded for three weeks to undergo psychiatric evaluation after he spent his first two weeks in remand at the police headquarters for investigation.

Many neighbors were shocked to hear about the murders, as they knew both Teo and Choong to be polite and friendly people. Many people, including PAP member of Parliament Vikram Nair from Sembawang GRC, came to the funeral to offer condolences to the bereaved family and the victims. The funeral was held by Roland Tay, who later authorized the cremation of the victims' corpses.

== Trial ==
=== Proceedings ===
On 2 July 2019, Teo first stood trial in the High Court of Singapore for the murders of Choong Pei Shan and Teo Zi Ning. He was represented by leading criminal lawyer Eugene Thuraisingam, and the three-men prosecution team was led by Deputy Public Prosecutor (DPP) Han Ming Kuang (the other members were Dillon Kok and Ng Jun Chong). Teo also faced a third charge of murder for killing his unborn son, but the charge was stood down for the time being whilst his trial for murdering Zi Ning and Choong.

During the trial that lasted from July 2019 to July 2020 (which was delayed half-way partially due to the COVID-19 pandemic in Singapore), Teo gave his account of what happened and raised defences of diminished responsibility and grave and sudden provocation. Teo stated that he was gravely provoked by Choong and her insults during the argument on the day of the murder, which made him lose control out of extreme rage and kill Choong. His lawyer also argued that Zi Ning was the center of the provocation, since she witnessed the argument, which made the defence of provocation effective in Zi Ning's murder as well. Jacob Rajesh, a private psychiatrist, assessed Teo and stated that he suffered from depression due to him getting pressured and depressed by his financial debts, and the condition impaired his mental responsibility and thus qualified him for a defence of diminished responsibility.

However, DPP Han argued that Teo was in full control of himself, as the provocation by Choong's supposed hurtful words was not sufficient to make Teo lose control. Instead, the murders were committed in a methodical manner and not due to loss of self-control. Turning to Zi Ning, she was at the time watching television and playing with her toys, and she was not taking part in the arguments, hence she could not be responsible for the provocation. Teo was also not suffering from depression, as confirmed by the prosecution's psychiatrist Derrick Yeo, who described Teo's behaviour as "logical, goal-directed and showed planning". He said that Teo was able to make a choice to take his wife's life as he wanted the family to escape the financial burdens and also to not let Zi Ning be alone without love after her parents' deaths. Yeo also stated that if Teo could fabricate suicide notes and tried to find ways to commit suicide, as well as enjoying pornographic material, surfing the internet and watch videos, and observe regular meals and sleeping hours during the eight post-killing days, he was clearly in full control of his mental faculties and planning. Yeo also said that Teo told him during his psychiatric remand that he never regretted killing his wife, but he regretted killing his daughter, whom he called his "dearest".

Not only that, the prosecution presented evidence of Choong's phone messages, which showed evidence that Choong already knew about the financial debts since October 2016 and had wanted to help her husband to settle the debts, unlike Teo's claims that his wife only knew about it days before the murders. Their affectionate messages with each other showed that the couple was optimistic in spite of their difficulties, with Teo looking forward to his job and paying off the debts, and Choong planning to go back to work once their son turned two. They also charged that Teo, despite his denials, had not truly forgiven his wife for her affair with Mark Mu. After closing submissions were made on 5 July 2020 (a month after Singapore ended its "circuit breaker" measures), the High Court reserved its judgement until 12 November 2020.

=== Judgement ===
Teo Ghim Heng, who was sentenced to death for murdering his daughter and pregnant wife.

On 12 November 2020, High Court judge Kannan Ramesh decided on his final verdict, and found Teo guilty of the murders of Choong Pei Shan and Teo Zi Ning under Section 300(a) of the Penal Code. He found that Teo was not suffering from diminished responsibility and sudden and grave provocation. He stated that Teo was able to mix well with his colleagues and maintain good work performance and behaviour despite his increasing financial debts. He stated that Teo's claims of depression did not match to his behaviour before, during and after his crimes as he was able to sleep regular hours, still surfing the Web and YouTube and watching pornographic materials after murdering Choong and Zi Ning, and even meticulously thought of ways to mask the deaths as suicidal and hide the truth of the deaths from his family and in-laws.

Also, even if he was provoked and calmed down, Teo continued to strangle Choong as he, from his account, wanted to kill the family to not let them get burdened by his debts. It was apparent from this claim that Teo's mind was not blinded by rage or loss of self-control, but rather "conscious, deliberate and outcome-driven" after he calmed down. Zi Ning was also innocent of the provocation from Choong and she was not at fault for the couple's arguments since she was not a participant. Hence the defences of diminished responsibility and provocation did not work in Teo's favour.

As a result of his double convictions for intentional murder, 44-year-old Teo was sentenced to death (the only penalty for murder under Section 300(a) in Singapore). Teo confirmed through his lawyer that he would appeal against his conviction and sentence. The prosecution also withdrew the third charge of murder against Teo for the death of his unborn son.

Teo was one of the only two people to be sentenced to death for murder by the courts of Singapore in 2020. The other person was Ahmed Salim, a Bangladeshi painter who killed his Indonesian girlfriend Nurhidayati Wartono Surata (aged 34) at a Geylang hotel on 30 December 2018, two days before his 30th birthday. After the High Court handed him a mandatory death sentence for murder under Section 300(a) of the Penal Code on 14 December 2020, Ahmed's appeal was dismissed by the Court of Appeal on 19 January 2022, and he was hanged on 28 February 2024.

== Appeal processes ==
=== Court of Appeal ===
In September 2021, while Teo's appeal was still pending, convicted murderer Iskandar Rahmat, who was on death row for a 2013 robbery-murder case, tried to apply for himself to participate in Teo's appeal, so as to provide arguments in support of Teo's constitutionality challenge and to favour his own challenge. The application, however, was disapproved since Iskandar's crime was not related to that of Teo, and the rights to making arguments in Teo's appeal should be reserved to Teo and his defence counsel only. Iskandar's complete exhaustion of his avenues of appeal would make the application unmeritorious if allowed by the appellate court, hence the Court of Appeal dismissed it. It is not known if Teo himself knew about it or if he personally would have allowed Iskandar's participation in his appeal.

On 13 October 2021, 11 months after his trial, Teo's appeal against his conviction and sentence was heard at the Court of Appeal of Singapore. Once again, Eugene Thuraisingam emphasised to the five-judge appellate panel – which included Chief Justice Sundaresh Menon and four Judges of Appeal Steven Chong, Judith Prakash, Belinda Ang and Chao Hick Tin – about Teo's defence of diminished responsibility, arguing that Teo had, in the aftermath of the killings, tried multiple times to commit suicide but fruitlessly, despite the evidence that Teo often behaved and functioned normally up till the murders. Thuraisingam also raised a constitutionality argument regarding first-degree murder (or intentional murder) under Section 300(a) of the Penal Code of Singapore while declining to proceed with the third defence of sudden and grave provocation. Likewise, the prosecution, led by Winston Man, argued against Thuraisingam's case by citing the High Court's findings on Teo's behaviour before, during and after the murders, which did not substantially support Teo's defence of diminished responsibility, since it is not possible for one who was depressed could be able to function in some scenarios while having the inability to function in another.

After hearing the appeal, the five-judge Court of Appeal spent five months before deciding to dismiss Teo's appeal and affirming his death sentence on 23 February 2022. Justice Judith Prakash, who delivered the verdict, stated that the High Court was correct to identify that Teo did not suffer from diminished responsibility based on his post-killing behaviour and attempts to hide traces of his crime. Justice Prakash also laid out that Teo's reported symptoms were not consistent with the testimonies of his co-workers and family members, which meant that Teo did not suffer from major depressive disorder at all, since he did not display a depressed mood for most of the day nearly everyday or other symptoms like significant weight loss, insomnia or hypersomnia. Having accepted the major points of the lower court's judgement, Justice Prakash and her fellow four judges thus disapproved Teo's appeal and further condemned him to hang for Zi Ning's and Cheong's murders.

=== Clemency petition ===
After the loss of his appeal, Thuraisingam confirmed that his client would appeal to the President of Singapore for clemency as a final recourse to avoid execution. However, it was revealed in 2025 that Teo's clemency petition was denied by the President.

=== Legal challenge against Pacc Act ===
In December 2023, Teo was one of the 36 death row inmates who filed a legal motion to challenge the newly enacted Post-Appeal Applications in Capital Cases Act (Pacc Act), which was designed to manage the last-minute appeals made by death row prisoners who exhausted all avenues of appeal. Teo and his fellow plaintiffs argued that the new law was discriminatory against death row inmates and it would stall the last chances of the convicts' access to justice, which may lead to an unfair legal process. However, Justice Hoo Sheau Peng of the High Court dismissed the appeal, citing that the law was implemented in light of the rising number of inmates filing last-minute appeals before their executions and abusing of court processes, and its purpose was to sift out appeals that were made without merit. She also said that the legal rights of the death row prisoners were not violated by the provisions of the Act, since the law was not passed for enforcement yet. A follow-up appeal by the same 36 plaintiffs was dismissed by the Court of Appeal on 27 March 2024.

=== Legal challenge against LASCO ===
On 9 May 2024, Teo and another 35 death row prisoners appealed to the High Court, arguing that the policy of the Legal Assistance Scheme for Capital Offences (LASCO) was not to assign counsel for death row inmates who filed further legal motions after exhausting their avenues of appeal against capital punishment and conviction, and this infringed the need to uphold fairness of court processes and constitutional rights of the prisoners, as well as breaching their access to justice and right to legal representation. However, 11 days after the appeal was filed, Justice Dedar Singh Gill found there was no reasonable cause of action and dismissed the motion, as the LASCO was "perfectly entitled to adopt or change its policy regarding its provision of legal aid", and there could have been multiple reasons for LASCO to not assign lawyers for such convicts, such as the need to allocate resources to aid new defendants who were facing trial and appeal and deter possible abuse of court processes. The judge also stated that the lack of representation from LASCO in post-appeal applications did not deprive the accused persons of their right to life or personal liberty, which was especially so since all the plaintiffs in this case were already convicted and sentenced at this stage, and also exhausted their appeals against conviction and/or sentence, and their rights to access to justice were not violated by the lack of free legal representation, given that they still had the entitlement to engage lawyers on their own accord in any post-appeal applications. Aside from this, Justice Gill said while the applicants should not be deterred from filing applications with merit to prevent the miscarriage of justice, but any motions launched "at an eleventh hour and without merit" should be regarded as a "stopgap" measure to delay the carrying out of the offender's death sentence. On these grounds, Justice Gill rejected the appeal.

== Execution ==
On 16 April 2025, 49-year-old Teo Ghim Heng was executed in Changi Prison after his clemency to President and appeal to appeal judge were dismissed.

The Singapore Police Force confirmed in a media statement that Teo's death sentence was officially carried out, despite not naming the offender, and emphasised that Teo had been accorded full due process and duly represented by counsel throughout the legal process.

== See also ==
- Capital punishment in Singapore
- List of major crimes in Singapore
