= 2010 Kallang slashings =

2010 robbery-murder case in Singapore

- Date: 30 May 2010; 16 years ago
- Location: Kallang, Singapore
- Participants: Micheal Anak Garing (Note: His name is also spelt as Michael Anak Garing) (a.k.a. Muhammad Arif Sufi), 22 (murder); Tony Anak Imba, 31 (murder); Hairee Landak, 19 (armed robbery with hurt); Donny Meluda (alias Abdul Rahman Abdullah), 19 (armed robbery with hurt)

Micheal Anak Garing, one of the Kallang slashers who was hanged in Singapore's Changi Prison for murder

The 2010 Kallang slashings refer to a series of four robberies committed by a group of four Malaysians from Sarawak, Malaysia in the night of 29 May 2010 and the early hours of the morning of 30 May 2010 (some of the culprits were not involved in the subsequent four robberies), mostly around Kallang Area, Singapore. In the robberies, there were a total of four victims – the first three victims were seriously injured and hospitalised while a fourth victim was killed.

Three of the perpetrators were charged with murder and the final culprit remained on the run for seven years before being arrested and charged with murder. Eventually, two were convicted of murder - with one eventually hanged in 2019 and the other jailed for life and caned - while the other two were dealt with lengthy jail terms and caning for multiple charges of armed robbery with hurt.

== Background ==
=== The first three robberies ===
Later on, during the early hours of 30 May 2010, 24-year-old Indian national and construction worker Sandeep Singh was chatting with family members from India on his phone while sitting on a rocking horse in a playground, and while doing so, Sandeep was attacked by a group of four robbers. He was first hit on the head from behind by one of the attackers, 31-year-old Sarawakian Tony Anak Imba, with a brick. Sandeep was also slashed on the head, left forearm, left ear, and back with a parang by Micheal Anak Garing, Tony's 22-year-old accomplice. Sandeep was robbed of his mobile phone and wallet. The skull fracture exposed Sandeep's brain and broken bone chips were embedded on his brain. Medical experts later testified that the injury would have led to Sandeep's death from a brain infection, but he survived with timely medical intervention.

After robbing Sandeep, the four robbers - Tony, Micheal, and two of their accomplices and fellow Malaysians from Sarawak, 19-year-old cleaner Hairee Anak Landak and 19-year-old Donny Anak Meluda, encountered 19-year-old Singaporean Ang Jun Heng (Chinese: 洪隽衡; Pe̍h-ōe-jī: Âng Choān-hêng; pinyin: Hóng Jùnhéng). At that time, Ang was walking alone along a footpath beneath the MRT tracks near Kallang MRT station after a late night out with his friends. Tony first kicked Ang. When Ang, then a full-time National Serviceman, was about to defend himself, he was attacked by the other robbers, who punched, kicked, and slashed him. Ang's left palm was severed during the attack, causing him to lose the four fingers on his left hand. He also sustained head injuries and laceration wounds, including a deep wound on his neck which almost cut his spinal cord. Nine hours after the attack, Ang was spotted by a pedestrian who spotted him lying in an open field behind a school. Medical experts highlighted at the trial that this particular injury could have been fatal without timely medical care.

The third victim was 43-year-old Indian national Egan Karrupaiah. The pipe fitter was similarly robbed of his mobile phone and wallet, and was assaulted by Micheal, Tony, and Donny (Hairee was not involved in the assault this time even though he had been there at the scene); this left him with several fractures and lacerations, and four of his fingers sliced off. Both of his arms were almost hacked to the bone.

=== The fourth and last robbery: the death of Shanmuganathan Dillidurai ===
Kallang slashing victim Shanmuganathan Dillidurai who succumbed from his wounds.

After the robbers had robbed Egan, they targeted 41-year-old construction worker Shanmuganathan Dillidurai whom they found riding a bicycle along Kallang Road near a condominium. Tony first attacked him by knocking him off the bicycle. After that, Shanmuganathan was severely assaulted by all the four robbers, with Micheal wielding a parang to slash him and Tony holding the man down. Shanmuganathan sustained a fractured skull, a severed left hand, a deep slash wound across his neck (severing his jugular vein) and a wound over his back which cut so deep that his shoulder blade was cracked.

Shanmuganathan did not survive the attack and he died. His body was found at 7:30 am (SGT). An autopsy conducted by forensic pathologist Dr. Paul Chui revealed that there were twenty injuries (including the four injuries mentioned above) on Shanmuganathan, and four of these injuries were the ones that killed him. At the time of his death, Shanmuganathan, who came to Singapore from Chennai to work since 2008, was married with two children. Shanmuganathan was also the last victim of the Kallang robbers' crime spree, which lasted around eight hours.

=== Arrests and charges ===
After the commission of the four robbery offenses, police investigations led to the arrest of Micheal, Tony, and Hairee. It was found that before committing the serial robberies, the Kallang robbers had teamed up with another four Malaysians to commit another robbery in an unrelated case, where a 47-year-old Chinese national and construction worker Wang Jiu Sheng had his mobile phone stolen while getting slashed and beaten up. During the attack, Wang suffered deep cut on four fingers on his left hand, which he raised to defend himself.

As a result, the Kallang robbers' four other companions - Peter Usit Musa, 22; Slyvester Beragok, 26; Landa Surai, 28; and Shahman Milak, 21 - who participated in the robbery of Wang Jiu Sheng, were arrested. However, of all the eight people in the robbery, only Donny Meluda was not arrested, as he fled from Singapore into Malaysia hours after committing the gruesome robberies. Micheal, Tony, and Hairee, who were identified as the main participants of the Kallang robberies (together with the missing Donny Medula), were charged with the murder of Shanmuganathan Dillidurai; the crime of murder was considered as a hanging offence under Singapore law and thus carries the mandatory death penalty at that time. The four other people, who were not directly involved in the Kallang case, were only charged with gang robbery for their participation in the Wang Jiu Sheng robbery case. The investigation officer of the Kallang case was Senior Staff Sergeant Iskandar bin Rahmat, the police officer who would murder a father and son during a robbery in Kovan three years later and sentenced to death.

=== The convictions of the four minor accomplices ===
In October 2010, merely five months after the Kallang slashings, one of the minor accomplices – Shahman Milak – was sentenced to two years' imprisonment and six strokes of the cane for attempted robbery after pleading guilty to the charge. Peter Usit Musa, Landa Surai, and Slyvester Beragok were brought to trial for the gang robbery of Wang Jiu Sheng. The trio were each sentenced to six years' imprisonment and twelve strokes of the cane for gang robbery in February 2011.

== Victims ==
- Sandeep Singh, Indian national, construction worker, 24 years old: robbed of his mobile phone and wallet, suffered a fractured skull. (survived)
- Ang Jun Heng, Singaporean, full-time National Serviceman, 19 years old: robbed of his mobile phone and wallet, suffered a severed left hand and several laceration wounds, with one so deep that it almost cut his spinal cord. (survived)
- Egan Karrupaiah, Indian national, pipe fitter, 43 years old: robbed of his wallet and mobile phone, suffered various lacerations and fractures, four of his fingers cut off, and both his arms hacked to the bone. (survived)
- Shanmuganathan Dillidurai, Indian national, construction worker, 41 years old: robbed of his mobile phone, suffered a fractured skull, a severed left hand, a slash wound across his neck, and a back wound so deep that his shoulder blade was cracked. Found dead at 7:30 am (SGT), 30 May 2010.

== The trials of the Kallang murderers ==
=== Hairee Anak Landak's conviction and sentence ===
Eventually, the murder charge against Hairee Anak Landak, who was of Iban descent, was reduced to one of armed robbery with hurt. Hairee pleaded guilty to the reduced charge; he also admitted to two more charges of armed robbery with hurt relating to the attacks on Sandeep and Ang and was thus convicted of these three criminal charges while a fourth charge was taken into consideration during sentencing.

On 18 January 2013, 23-year-old Hairee Landak was sentenced to a total of 33 years' imprisonment and the maximum caning sentence of 24 strokes of the cane; during sentencing, Justice Tay Yong Kwang reportedly pointed out the "extremely vicious" nature of the attacks, agreeing with the prosecution to commit Hairee to a lengthy jail term with caning despite the mitigation plea by Hairee's two lawyers John Abraham and Rajan Supramaniam for leniency on account of Hairee's young age at the time of the offense and his cooperation with the police after his arrest. There was no appeal filed against the sentence.

=== The murder trial of Micheal Anak Garing, and Tony Anak Imba ===
The trial of Micheal Anak Garing and Tony Anak Imba began on 3 October 2013. Micheal was represented by lawyers Ramesh Tiwary and Josephus Tan, while Tony was represented by lawyers B. J. Lean and Amarick Gill Singh. The prosecution team consisted of Deputy Public Prosecutor (DPP) Anandan Bala, DPP Seraphina Fong Mian Yi, and DPP Marcus Foo Guo Wen from the Attorney-General's Chambers. The case was heard before Justice Choo Han Teck in the High Court of Singapore.

At the trial, all the three victims - Sandeep Singh, Ang Jun Heng, and Egan Karrupaiah - all testified at the trial against the two murder defendants. Even though he was the investigative officer in charge of this case, Senior Staff Sergeant Iskandar bin Rahmat, however, did not come to the trial to testify against the two men because he was undergoing investigations and remanded for his involvement in the Kovan double murders, which he committed merely three months before the beginning of the men's murder trial. The defense counsel for the two men sought to object to the prosecution's evidence regarding the first robberies they committed before that of Shanmuganathan, arguing over the pre-judicial effect it might have on their clients' cases. Later on, Justice Choo ruled that the evidence of the other robberies are relevant to the case.

In their respective defenses, both men gave conflicting defenses and blamed each other for the death of Shanmuganathan. Micheal insisted in his defense that he did wield the parang but only swung it over the victim's head, claiming it was Tony who snatched the parang from him and ran back to the crime scene to slash the victim after they robbed him of his wallet and left the scene (which is consistent to his statements to the police); while Tony asserted in his defense that it was Micheal alone who used the parang to attack Shanmuganathan, even claiming he did not share the common intention of assaulting the victim, merely tagging along to commit robbery and even claimed he tried to stop Micheal from using the parang, at one point, during the attack on Sandeep Singh.

Additionally, Hairee Landak, who was serving his 33-year sentence at the time of the two men's trial, testified that Micheal was the only person of the four who used the parang, and even stated Tony had held down the victim Shanmuganathan while Micheal continued his slashing attack on the man. However, the inconsistencies in his police statements and court testimonies, as well as his difficulty in recalling some of the events were impeached and pointed out by Micheal's lawyer Ramesh Tiwary as alleged lies to the court.

=== Verdict and conviction ===
The trial lasted for twelve days. On 20 January 2014, Justice Choo Han Teck delivered his verdict. He found both Micheal Garing and Tony Imba guilty of murder and convicted them as charged. Justice Choo determined that Micheal was the only person who used the 58-cm long parang to attack not only the deceased victim Shanmuganathan, but the other victims of their robbery spree, rejecting Micheal's evidence that Tony was the one using the parang to slash Shanmuganathan. Justice Choo also rejected Tony's claims of his only intention was to rob the victims, pointing out his active involvement in the robberies had contradicted his oblivion of the seriousness of the assaults by Micheal with the parang, which he said in his own words while reading the verdict, "Having seen three victims lying in their own blood, it lies ill in his mouth to say at trial that he did not know that Shanmuganathan would be slashed."

Additionally, Justice Choo pointed out that despite the unclear aspects of Hairee's evidence, he accepted Hairee's evidence of Tony restraining the deceased victim during the lethal attack, and also the prosecution's evidence of the other robberies committed before Shanmuganathan's despite them having stood down the robbery charges, finding the latter relevant to the facts of the case. However, Justice Choo stated he would reserve judgement and take some time to decide on the sentences of the two men, postponing the sentencing to a later date, allowing both the prosecution and defense to make submissions on sentencing.

At the time of Micheal and Tony's trial, the changes to the law took effect in 2013, which made the death penalty no longer mandatory for certain murder offenses which were committed with no intention to kill; for this, the judges are allowed to impose a discretionary sentence of life imprisonment with/without caning other than the death penalty to such offenders. Micheal and Tony were charged with murder under section 300(c) of the Penal Code, which constitutes an act where a person intentionally inflict a bodily injury on another person, and the bodily injury itself is sufficient in the ordinary cause of nature to cause death. They would face either life in prison with caning or death by hanging if they were found guilty of murder under this particular section.

The prosecution argued for the death penalty for both men, arguing that both accused are ought to be held equally culpable for their part in the robbery and murder of Shanmuganathan Dillidurai, while the defense lawyers of the two men argued that the death penalty was inappropriate in their clients' cases, and gave their respective reasons. However, it would be another year before the two men get to learn their fates.

=== Sentence ===
On 20 April 2015, more than a year after they were convicted, the two men were finally sentenced. Micheal Garing was sentenced to death while Tony Imba was sentenced to life imprisonment and 24 strokes of the cane. Additionally, Tony's life sentence was ordered to commence from the date of his conviction by the High Court the year before.

Explaining why Micheal Garing received the harsher sentence of death, Justice Choo Han Teck stated in his verdict that Micheal, armed with a parang, had each time violently attacked his victims; he found the prosecution's evidence of the previous robberies relevant to the murder case as the nature of each attack was just as violent as the one that took Shanmuganathan's life. For this, he stated it was justified to sentence Micheal to suffer death based on his conduct at the time of the attacks and murder.

As for Tony Imba, Justice Choo contended that he may have shared the common intention with Micheal, Hairee Landak and the missing Donny Meluda to rob the victims, he accepted the submissions of Tony's lawyer Amarick Gill that Tony did not inflict the fatal injuries on Shanmuganathan despite being the initiator of the attack, which gave him a lower culpability than Micheal on the charge of murder. Hence, he resisted the urgings of the prosecution to give Tony the death sentence and instead exercise his discretion to commit Tony to incarceration for life with caning.

The families and friends of Micheal Garing and Tony Imba were present in the courtroom when the sentence was passed. Tony's 45-year-old elder brother Dom Imba said to reporters that the family was grateful that Tony would not be hanged. Amarick Gill also told reporters that even though a life sentence was nonetheless a harsh punishment, he stated that it was a fair sentence for Tony in relation to his crime.

On the other hand, Micheal's 64-year-old father Garing Kanyan, who had been praying for his son to escape the death penalty since his son's arrest, told reporters that the family reacted badly to Micheal's sentence. He added that he had a bad feeling when everyone in the courtroom was told to stand before Micheal was sentenced (especially after they remained on their seats when Tony was sentenced to life imprisonment), and his worst fears were confirmed when he heard the death sentence being pronounced on Micheal, who later sought forgiveness from him after his sentencing. He also said the family will not lose hope and will seek to have Micheal escape the death penalty. It is not known if the surviving victims and their loved ones, and the family of the deceased victim Shanmuganathan Dillidurai is present to witness their attackers being sentenced.

Micheal's lawyer confirmed that Micheal would be appealing against his conviction and sentence. The prosecution also stated on 27 April they would appeal against Tony's life sentence.

== The appeal process ==
=== Hearing of the appeals ===
On 5 September 2016, Micheal Garing's appeal was first heard before the Court of Appeal, heard by three Judges of Appeal - Chao Hick Tin, Andrew Phang, and Judith Prakash. At the same time, the prosecution's appeal against Tony Imba's life term was also heard in the same court as Micheal's. Like Micheal, Tony initially filed an appeal against his conviction and sentence but he subsequently decided to not proceed with the appeal and withdrew it.

The defence counsels of the two men and the prosecution made their respective arguments as the Court of Appeal heard the appeals from Micheal and the prosecution. Micheal's lawyer Ramesh Tiwary argued against the murder conviction and sentence; Tiwary additionally argued that even if the Court of Appeal decided to uphold Micheal's conviction, he sought for reconsideration on Micheal's sentence, arguing that the death sentence was inappropriate and his client should be imprisoned for life like Tony due to the error of the original trial judge to take the evidence of the other robberies into consideration for the sentencing of Micheal. Tiwary also insisted that his client did not wield the parang alone and it was Tony who inflict the fatal injuries, and Micheal only caused hurt to the victim twice with the parang.

In their appeal, the prosecution submitted that Tony should also be sentenced to death like Micheal; they argued that Justice Choo Han Teck had erred in sentencing Tony to imprisonment for life with caning by creating a distinction between the culpabilities of both Tony and Micheal solely based on the fact that Tony did not wield the murder weapon. They said that based on Tony's conviction for committing murder in furtherance of the group's common intention to commit robbery, it is immaterial that Tony was not armed with the weapon since his criminal liability of murder is linked to the basis of common intention. For his active involvement in the crime, holding Shanmuganathan down in an armlock while Micheal slashed the man, and having known fully well that Micheal will mercilessly slash the victim, which led to the death of the victim, Tony demonstrated a blatant disregard for human life and his conduct thus deserved the death penalty.

To counter the prosecution, Tony's lawyer Amarick Gill argued that Tony was merely a starter of the attack and thus his sentence should not be the same as Micheal's. He said that Justice Choo is correct to say that Tony did not wield the parang or inflict the lethal injuries on Shanmuganathan when he sentenced Tony to life in prison with 24 strokes of the cane in the original trial. He highlighted that Hairee Landak's testimony of Tony restraining the victim during Micheal's parang attack is inconsistent as Micheal did not mention Tony restraining the victim. He argued that if Tony had done so, his clothes would have been heavily stained with blood, yet there were only some DNA and blood found on his belt and shoes at the time of his arrest. Amarick Gill also said that Tony would have been injured by the parang if he really restrained the victim Shanmuganathan while Micheal attacked the man, for which there was none.

After which, the judgement was reserved by the Court of Appeal and the verdict was scheduled to be delivered on 25 January 2017. However, due to the capture of the final culprit and fugitive Donny Meluda on 14 January 2017, the date of the judgement was postponed to 27 February 2017.

=== Outcome of appeals ===
On 27 February 2017, the Court of Appeal released their verdict, with Justice Chao delivering the judgement: they dismissed both appeals from the defense and the prosecution and upheld both men's respective sentences, effectively bringing 28-year-old Micheal Garing one step closer to the gallows and ultimately led to 38-year-old Tony Imba to be spared from the gallows.

Justice Chao stated in their judgement that there is no doubt that Micheal had attacked Shanmuganathan with a parang in a savage and merciless manner, and in light of a recent landmark appeal ruling in the case of convicted murderer Kho Jabing, by comparison, the sheer brutality from Micheal towards his fallen victim had demonstrated a blatant disregard for human life, which made the death penalty the only appropriate sentence in Micheal's case. As such, the three judges of Appeal dismissed Micheal's appeal and upheld his sentence and conviction. The three judges of Appeal, like the original trial judge, determined that it was Micheal alone who used the parang during the attack and Tony did not use the parang as what Micheal and his lawyers argued about.

Turning to Tony's case, Justice Chao stated that it was not disputed that Tony started off the violent attack on Shanmuganathan by kicking the construction worker off his bicycle. However, they were not satisfied that Tony did hold on to the deceased for a significant amount of time long enough for Micheal to inflict the fatal injuries; they accept Tony's lawyer Amarick Gill's argument that from Micheal's savage and indiscriminate attack on Shanmuganathan with the parang while Tony restraining the deceased, it would be unlikely for Tony to do so without himself suffering the blows. They rejected the prosecution's argument that Tony had deliberately positioned himself in a manner where he could not be injured by the parang, as their argument was speculative and not proven by evidence. The lack of Shanmuganathan's DNA and blood on the clothes Tony wore during the attack further weaken this possibility (though it had traces of the DNA of the victim Ang Jun Heng). Since it is not possible to completely remove the DNA from the clothes contaminated by blood even with washing the clothes, the absence of Shanmuganathan's DNA and/or blood on Tony's clothes (which Tony had washed after the crime spree) had supported Amarick Gill's argument.

They also took note on how the third accomplice Hairee Landak had difficulty to recall the events that took place on 30 May 2010, and the numerous discrepancies in his police statements and court testimonies (as pointed out by Micheal's lawyer Ramesh Tiwary). However, they said these were not significant enough to make his evidence against Micheal unreliable, and they accept that from Hairee's evidence that it was Micheal who alone used the parang to attack the victim. They also contended that with the same difficulty of recalling his evidence and the lack of lighting at the murder scene during the time they robbed Shanmuganathan, it is unsatisfactory that Tony had indeed restrained Shanmuganathan for a significant period of time during the fatal assault as what Hairee demonstrated in the court.

The Court of Appeal also determined that from this unproven hypothesis of Tony holding on to the deceased long enough for Micheal to inflict the fatal injuries, they were not satisfied that Tony had a blatant disregard for human life where the death penalty is warranted. Even though Tony likely knew that Micheal would use the parang on Shanmuganathan as he did on all their previous victims, and had been the one initiating the attack, it is insufficient to indicate any blatant disregard for human life on Tony's part.

The Court of Appeal also said that had there been a pre-conceived plan to inflict the grievous injuries on the deceased victim or to kill the victim in such a violent fashion, or more certainty on the evidence of Tony's actual participation in the crime, it would have been justified to sentence Tony to death. But since none of the above were proven or present, the appellate court find no reason to raise Tony's life sentence to a death sentence. For this, they dismissed the prosecution's appeal, affirming Justice Choo Han Teck's decision to impose the discretionary life sentence on Tony. The prosecution and defence counsels of the duo were commended for their efforts during the appeal process as the Court of Appeal concluded the hearing.

== Donny Meluda's arrest and final sentence ==
On 14 January 2017, nearly seven years after the Kallang slashings, the final culprit, and fugitive Donny Meluda was finally caught by the Malaysian police as he arrived at Sibu Airport on a flight from Kuala Lumpur, Malaysia. Donny, who converted to Islam and changed his name to Abdul Rahman Abdullah while on the run, was remanded in Sarawak for four days before being handed over to the Singaporean police on 18 January 2017. On 20 January 2017, two days after arriving in Singapore, 25-year-old Donny was charged with murder.

In the midst of the ongoing appeal process, the respective defense counsels of Micheal and Tony, upon receiving news of Donny's arrest, asked for the deferment of the delivery of the verdict by the Court of Appeal as they wanted to interview Donny, citing that his testimony might be of help to the cases of their clients. On 25 January 2017, the day when the verdict regarding the appeals was to be released, the Court of Appeal agreed to defer the delivery of their judgement till 27 February 2017. However, Donny refused to be interviewed.

Eventually, the murder charge against Donny Meluda, who is now also addressed as Abdul Rahman based on his Muslim name and alias, was reduced to armed robbery with hurt. Abdul Rahman pleaded guilty to the reduced charge. He also faced three additional charges of armed robbery with hurt for his role in the robberies of Sandeep Singh, Ang Jun Heng, and Egan Karrupaiah. Similarly, Abdul Rahman pleaded guilty to two of these three charges and the third would also be taken into consideration during sentencing.

In his mitigation plea, as presented by his lawyer Siva S. Krishnasamy, Abdul Rahman pleaded for leniency, stating that he had turned over a new leaf and led a reformed life free of crime as a gardener after embracing Islam while on the run, and even preached to a missionary group in West Malaysia. Mr Krishnasamy also asked for the court to punish his client with less than 32 years behind bars. The prosecutor who was prosecuting Abdul Rahman, DPP Anandan Bala (who also prosecuted Micheal and Tony for murder) however, sought a jail term of at least 33 years and 24 strokes of the cane, arguing that Abdul Rahman's life on the right side of the law while on the run should not be regarded as mitigating, as the seven years he spent in Malaysia eluding justice was aggravating and it prolonged the closure the victims and their families needed and delayed the conclusion of the necessary legal proceedings against the culprits of the Kallang slashings, which the prosecution described as "one of the most violent robberies in recent memory" as they argued and cited the key role played by Abdul Rahman together with his three partners-in-crime on that fateful night of 30 May 2010.

On 19 November 2018, Abdul Rahman Abdullah, then 27 years old, was sentenced by Justice Valerie Thean to a total of 33 years' imprisonment and 24 strokes of the cane (essentially the same sentence as that of his former accomplice Hairee Landak, who is aged 28 at this point of time) for his participation in the Kallang robberies. The sentencing of Abdul Rahman has finally brought an end to the court proceedings made against all members of the Kallang slashings. There was no appeal filed against the sentence.

== Execution of Micheal Anak Garing ==
=== Efforts to save Micheal Garing ===
Subsequently, after the failure of his appeal, Micheal Garing remains on death row for another period of two years and one month. During that time, Micheal has converted to Islam and changed his name to Muhammad Arif Sufi.

Upon the confirmation of Micheal Garing's execution date, Malaysia requested for Singapore to grant clemency to Micheal.

In early March 2019, a death warrant was issued for Micheal, scheduling him to be hanged on the morning of 22 March. On 14 March, the family and relatives of Micheal were given an eight-day notice of the upcoming execution and asked to make preparations for the necessary funeral arrangements. Malaysian human rights lawyer N. Surendran released a statement on 18 March, saying, “This extremely short notice is disturbing and a cause for concern. It gives the family scant time to spend with Michael in his final days and to make preparations.”, condemning the Singaporean authorities for giving such a short notice of execution to Micheal's family. He also called on President Halimah Yacob to grant Micheal clemency and reduce his death sentence to life imprisonment, adding that while Micheal deserves to be punished for the heinous killing of Dillidurai, he should be given a second chance for rehabilitation and that it would be a greater wrong for the state to execute the Sarawakian. He also urged Singapore to impose a moratorium on all executions and work towards the abolition of the death penalty. Similarly, on 19 March, Liew Vui Keong, Minister in the Prime Minister's Department, stated that Malaysia will issue a letter to Singapore to protest against Micheal's pending execution. Amnesty International joined in the next day to protest against the imminent hanging of Micheal.

At the same time, Micheal's parents, Garing Anak Kanyan and Ensiring Anak Garman sent a clemency petition to the President of Singapore, pleading with the President to have mercy on Micheal, who was the third child out of the couple's four children, and to spare his life. In the clemency petition, Michael's parents wrote that, "We humbly ask the president of Singapore for mercy and compassion to spare the life of our son Michael. We do not want to excuse our son's offense, but we ask for mercy." Micheal had also petitioned to the president for clemency, in a bid to have his death sentence commuted to life imprisonment. Prime Minister of Malaysia Tun Dr. Mahathir Mohamed gathered reporters on 20 March 2019, stating the government will save Micheal as "many believe that the death penalty is excessive and hope that Singapore feels the same way too." He added that the death penalty was harsh and should be replaced, except for some special cases.

On 21 March 2019, both the European Union (EU) and Embassy of Switzerland in Singapore also voiced out and called for Singapore to spare Micheal Garing from the hangman's noose and pushed for the president to grant him clemency. They both called for the Singapore government to re-adopt a moratorium on the death penalty and to abolish it.

=== Clemency plea failed: the death of Micheal Garing ===
Despite the appeals and international protests, Micheal still failed in his final bid to escape the gallows, as President Halimah Yacob rejected the clemency plea submitted by Micheal on the advice of the Cabinet.

On the morning of 22 March 2019, nearly 9 years after the unfortunate death of Shanmuganathan Dillidurai, 30-year-old Micheal Anak Garing – was finally put to death by hanging in the state gallows of Changi Prison for his murder. A day after his execution, Micheal's body was brought back by flight to his family in Sarawak, and it arrived in Kapit by speedboat. A funeral was held, and Micheal's body was later buried in a Muslim cemetery in Kapit. Malaysian news reports stated that Micheal's parents were devastated upon receiving news of their son's death. An unnamed relative of Micheal said to reporters, "I still do not want to believe (the news) despite being told the sentence has been carried out."

Back in Malaysia, Suara Rakyat Malaysia (Suaram) condemned the city-state's hanging of Micheal. They said that the death penalty does not and will not provide justice. They said that Micheal's execution will not deter any similar offences in the future or undo his criminal acts, and called for both Singapore and Malaysia to abolish the death penalty. They said the death penalty merely endorses and repeat the violence and senseless loss of life inflicted by the accused through his crime and legitimise violence. On the day of Micheal's execution, Suaram released a statement, stating that Malaysia must learn from Singapore's example to ensure Malaysia's total abolition of the death penalty, and not legitimising violence and murder through the criminal justice system. Suaram also reportedly offered condolences to Micheal's surviving family members and relatives.

In a statement, according to The Straits Times (Singapore's national daily newspaper), the Ministry of Home Affairs (MHA) said Micheal was accorded full due process under the law, and was represented by legal counsel throughout the process. "Our laws apply equally to all, regardless of whether the offender is local or foreign," said MHA, reiterating that all the foreigners who visit or reside in Singapore must abide by Singapore's laws. The ministry also said that the death penalty is part of Singapore's criminal justice system and is used only against very serious crimes. MHA also stressed that every sovereign state has the right to decide if the death penalty should be retained or abolished, depending on their own circumstances.

Micheal and another unnamed person (presumably Chia Kee Chen) were the two people hanged for murder in 2019. The duo remained as the last two people executed for murder in Singapore for the next five years, until 28 February 2024, when Bangladeshi painter Ahmed Salim was hanged for murdering his Indonesian girlfriend Nurhidayati Wartono Surata back in 2018.

== Aftermath ==
=== Public reactions ===
The news reports of the incidents at Kallang caused ripples and shock among the Singaporean society. It was reported that many Singaporeans gathered to donate money to the surviving Kallang victims (especially the foreign victims Sandeep Singh and Egan Karrupaiah) out of sympathy for their plight. There were also donations made to the bereaved family of the deceased victim Shanmuganathan Dillidurai back in his native Indian state of Chennai.

=== Fates of the other victims ===
After the major incidents in Kallang, the first victim Sandeep Singh, who recovered the fastest among all the victims, continued to stay in Singapore to work as a cleaner. He only left Singapore in 2014 to get married back in India.

For the third victim Ang Jun Heng, who also goes by the name Jairus Ang, he managed to recover from his injuries after spending six weeks in hospital and three operations (one of them lasted 27 hours). However, the doctors were unable to re-attach his left palm, and it had to be amputated, leaving behind only a thumb. As a result of his disability, Ang was unable to pursue his dream as a pilot. After his recovery, Ang, who was a former straight-A student from Raffles Institution, continued to serve his National Service in the navy. He also learnt to use only six fingers to do daily things like typing on a computer and holding utensils to eat. He also went on to represent Singapore in the 2011 Paracanoe World Championships, and pursue a two-year-long national athletic career, and attended the University of Virginia in USA. As of April 2017, Ang has graduated from university and he is currently working in USA. A follow-up report from the Straits Times on 25 November 2018, a week after Abdul Rahman's sentencing, revealed that besides pursuing his career, Ang was currently learning new sports like rock climbing and Brazilian jiu-jitsu.

According to an article, Ang stated he never felt any grudge against the assailants who attacked him on that fateful night of 30 May 2010. He stated he only felt regret that one of his fellow victims (referring to the deceased construction worker Shanmuganathan Dillidurai) lost his life, leaving his family bereaved, the plight of the other victims, and the ultimate price that the assailants had to pay for their grievous acts (especially the executed Kallang murderer Micheal Anak Garing). When Ang's parents were approached to speak about their son's ordeal and feelings, they stated that they were devastated to see him having to suffer such a plight, but they moved on after Ang himself moved on from the ordeal. When asked about the verdict and Micheal Garing's execution, Ang's mother said that she desired for the perpetrators to be punished, but she did not want the death penalty for any one of them, and instead preferred both caning and jail terms for them, as she said that from a mother's perspective, she understood that the robbers' mothers (indirectly referring to Micheal's mother) would feel anguish and sadness for their sons who would be executed.

The fourth and last survivor of the Kallang slashings, Egan Karrupaiah, managed to have his four severed fingers re-attached in an operation. However, his fingers were stiff and has limited mobility, causing him to unable to work for a period of four years after the incident. He stayed in Singapore to recuperate and only returned to India in 2014. At the advice of the physiotherapist, Egan performed some exercises to allow his fingers to be more mobile, and he eventually recovered. As of April 2015, Egan was back in India working as a shop assistant, a job offered out of goodwill to him.

According to Egan in an article, he said he was grateful to the people in Singapore who treated him with kindness after the unfortunate incident. He reportedly received more than $90,000 in donations. The money was used by Egan to pay for his family's expenses, the education fees of his two adult children - a son and a daughter - and to re-build a new house after his old home fell beyond repair. Even after his ordeal, Egan expressed that the incident did not negate the feelings he had towards Singapore and he still want to return to Singapore to work, hoping to find employment in the city-state. He added that he has left the traumatic event behind him and looked forward to the future.

=== In popular media ===
The case was re-enacted in a Singaporean Tamil-language crime show, titled Theerpugal, which meant "The Verdict" in Tamil. It first aired on Vasantham (a local Tamil language TV channel in Singapore) as the second episode of the show's fourth season on 9 January 2019, nearly two and a half months before Micheal Anak Garing's execution. The episode is currently available on meWATCH, with both Tamil and English subtitles. In the episode, lawyer Rajan Supramaniam, who represented Hairee Landak in his trial, appeared on the show to be interviewed and also gave some narration to the events that occurred in Kallang that fateful night. Another guest of the episode was Dr Morganavel Selvarajoo, who also narrated some of the events in Kallang, as well as providing some analysis of the case and the attacks.

In the episode, Rajan Supramaniam also revealed some details of Hairee's life prior to the incidents in Kallang, revealing that Hairee came from a very poor family, having siblings to look after, only studied up to Form 5 in secondary school, and sat for but failed in his SPM examinations (similar to the GCE O-levels in Singapore) and being unemployed in Sarawak before he came to Singapore. He stated why the four people, including his client, committed the robbery was because they were not earning much from their jobs and wanted to commit robbery to get more money. The lawyer also said that after his conviction and sentencing, Hairee accepted his punishment for what he had done, possibly indicating some remorse felt on Hairee's part.

In June 2022, local writer Foo Siang Luen wrote the second volume of his real-life crime book Justice Is Done, which was published by the Singapore Police Force (including a digital download-for-free e-book version) 17 years after Foo wrote the first volume. The book recorded some of the gruesome murder cases encountered and solved by police throughout the years between 2005 and 2016, and among these cases included the 2010 Kallang slashing case.

== See also ==
- Capital punishment in Singapore
- Life imprisonment in Singapore
- Caning in Singapore
- Kho Jabing
