= Ben Yair =

Ben Yair, ben Jair, Ben-Yair, etc. is a Hebrew patronymic or patronymic surname literally meaning "son of Jair (Yair). Notable people with the surname include:

- Ben Ben Yair (born 1992), Israeli footballer
- Michael Ben-Yair (born 1942) is a former Attorney General of Israel
- Phinehas ben Jair, a rabbinic sage of the second half of the 2nd century
