= Jahir =

Jahir, a variant of Jair, is a given name. It may refer to:

- Jahir Barraza (born 1990), Mexican footballer
- Jahir Butrón (born 1975), Peruvian footballer
- Jahir Khan, Fijian senior police officer of Indian descent
- Jahir Ocampo (born 1990), Mexican diver
