= Kovan double murders =

2013 high-profile double murder case in Singapore

- Date: 10 July 2013; 13 years ago
- Location: 14J Hillside Drive, Kovan, Singapore
- Motive: Robbery, and to silence the victims to avoid identification
- Deaths: 2
- Suspects: Iskandar bin Rahmat

On 10 July 2013, 67-year-old Tan Boon Sin and his 42-year-old son Tan Chee Heong were murdered in their home along Hillside Drive in Kovan, Singapore. Chee Heong's body was then dragged over 1 km, under a car driven by the killer, before being dislodged outside Kovan MRT station. Iskandar bin Rahmat, a senior staff sergeant policeman, was arrested and tried for the murders, and sentenced to death. Following the dismissal of all his appeals, he was hanged on 5 February 2025.

== Murders ==
=== Incident at Kovan MRT Station ===
On the afternoon of 10 July 2013, commuters at Kovan MRT station witnessed a silver Toyota Camry driving past, with the body of a man being dragged face-down under the car itself, with his belt stuck to the underside of the car and a trail of blood following it. Seeing this, about 15 to 20 cars honked at it to stop but to no avail. It was only when the car drove past the MRT station then the body was completely dislodged outside the station. Police were contacted and the body was later found to have head injuries and neck injuries. There were also a total of 20 stab wounds found on the body, 17 of them were mainly at the head, neck and chest.

=== Discovery of the second victim and eyewitness accounts ===
The police followed the blood trail, which stretched over 1 km and ended outside a house in Hillside Drive. The police were greeted by another corpse, that of an elderly man with a total of 27 knife wounds on his body, mostly at his head, neck, and chest. There were sock prints found in a linear path, stained in blood. A lane along Upper Serangoon Road and roads leading to Hillside Drive were closed by the police, leading to a massive traffic jam. Crowds also gathered around the house and where the first body was found. Both places were cordoned off for more than eight hours.

Before the sighting at Kovan MRT station, there was an eyewitness – Salamah, a 28-year-old domestic helper from a neighbour's house – who earlier saw the younger victim, who was said to be the elderly man's son, clutching his bleeding neck wound and collapsing in front of the house. She also claimed she saw another man running out of the house and get into a silver car to make his escape, which ran over the man's body and caused it to be dragged under the car, culminating into the scene that horrified members of the public at the MRT station. Anthony Fabian, a 56-year-old caretaker of a nearby vacant, disused school building, also saw the suspected killer moving the car over the younger victim's body and dragging it under the car; he claimed that after seeing this, he tried to shout at the driver to alert him but failed to catch up. These two people would become the prosecution's witnesses in the murder trial of the suspected Kovan double killer.

=== Victims ===
The next day, the Toyota Camry, which belonged to the older victim, was found parked outside an apartment in Eunos. By then, the police had classified the case as murder, and established the identities of the victims. The older victim was 67-year-old Tan Boon Sin (Chinese: 陈文新; Pe̍h-ōe-jī: Tân Bûn-sin; pinyin: Chén Wénxīn), while the younger victim found at Kovan MRT Station was his 42-year-old elder son Tan Chee Heong (Chinese: 陈志雄; Pe̍h-ōe-jī: Tân Chì-hiông; pinyin: Chén Zhìxióng).

According to his family, friends, colleagues and neighbours, Boon Sin was a very nice and hard-working person, a caring employer to his co-workers, and a kind, jovial, and even-tempered man who was close to his wife and three children (including Chee Heong) and never smoked or gambled. Boon Sin's widow also said that her husband had never once resorted to violence even during the couple's arguments, and was someone she could trust her life with. A Malaysian employee of Boon Sin's car workshop recalled the kindness his late employer showed him when he handed him his six months' worth of salary even when he was not working to take care of his ailing wife in Malaysia. As for Chee Heong, he was said to be a university graduate and owner of an electronics business married with two sons, both aged 10 and 3 respectively at the time of his death. Chee Heong was described as a responsible family man to his wife and sons, and also a filial son to his parents.

The investigations also revealed that Boon Sin was last seen alive at around 1 pm that afternoon, according to an employee who told police that the older victim had told him he had to leave and that he had reportedly withdrawn some items from the safe deposit box. By then, there were speculations over the motive behind the murder by the media, including a possible business dispute, but Boon Sin's car workshop business was strong and healthy, which dismissively refuted this particular theory.

=== Arrest of the suspect ===
On 12 July 2013, the suspect was discovered to be eating and then arrested at Restoran Singgah Selalu in Danga Bay, Johor Bahru, Malaysia by plainclothes police officers from the Royal Malaysia Police (RMP). Investigations by the Singapore Police Force (SPF) had established that the suspect was a 34-year-old police officer, Senior Staff Sergeant Iskandar bin Rahmat from the SPF in the Bedok Police Division. This information was revealed only after Iskandar was brought back to Singapore. Iskandar had applied for a day's leave on the day of the murders from his supervisor and at 11 pm on the night itself, Iskandar had left Singapore into Johor, Malaysia via the Causeway on a scooter. Iskandar and some of the RMP officers involved were regulars of the seafood restaurant, which was a popular eating spot for Singaporeans who came into Malaysia across the Woodlands Checkpoint.

Upon receiving the news of the suspect's arrest, then-Deputy Prime Minister Teo Chee Hean thanked the RMP, saying this was "an excellent example of the close and deeply valued partnership the law enforcement agencies of both countries have built over many decades".

=== Extradition and charges: Reactions to arrest ===
Soon after his arrest, Iskandar was extradited back to Singapore on 13 July, and two days later, he was charged in the State Courts of Singapore for the murders of the father and son, Tan Boon Sin and Tan Chee Heong. By then, the DPM Teo Chee Hean and Police Commissioner Ng Joo Hee had addressed the public and reporters about his arrest in a press conference, and for the first time, they revealed Iskandar's identity. This revelation brought a shock to all Singaporeans, including former police officers, MPs and netizens, that a senior policeman was involved in the double deaths at Kovan.

Not only did Teo offer his condolences to the bereaved families of the victims, he also expressed his shock over the first time when he heard that the suspect was a senior policeman, and his actions had tarnished the reputation of the Singapore Police Force. Teo also reiterated that there is zero tolerance for police officers who broke the law and his confidence that justice will be impartially served and asked the Police Commissioner to tell every police officer to perform their duties diligently to maintain the trust between the public and the police.

Ng similarly stated that the identity of the suspect as a policeman made the investigating officers more resolved to solve the case. He stated in the press conference that it was painful to discover that a policeman was involved, and they would investigate why a policeman who was sworn to fulfil his duty to uphold the law had broken it "in the most grievous way". He also acknowledged that due to the actions of Iskandar, there would be a public outcry, critically questioning the integrity and quality of the police force, but he stated that they would take every criticism in their own stride. He said that they will "prosecute him [Iskandar] to the greatest and maximum extent", and will ensure that they will not allow the tragedy to cause the public to lose their trust in the police.

Additionally, the residents at Hillside Drive expressed their relief to reporters when the suspect was arrested. Upon receiving news of Iskandar's arrest and his identity as a police officer, the bereaved Tan family demanded justice and expressed their shame that a policeman was involved in the deaths of Boon Sin and Chee Heong.

=== Remand of the suspect and funeral of Kovan victims ===
After Iskandar was charged, District judge Kessler Koh adjourned the case to the following week's Monday (22 July 2013) and Iskandar was remanded in police custody for further investigations. He was also taken to the crime scene to make an re-enactment of the alleged double murders, and was given a suspension from duty without pay by the police force. At the same time, a funeral was conducted at Teochew Funeral Parlour in Ubi for both Kovan victims and they were cremated on 16 July 2013. More than 100 relatives and friends attended the funeral, and several plainclothes policemen were deployed to inform reporters to keep their distance from the family. More visitors, including the long-time customers of Boon Sin's car workshop and the Workers' Party Members of Parliaments (MPs) Sylvia Lim (from Aljunied GRC) and Lee Li Lian (from Punggol East) also came to the funeral to pay their respects. Additionally, the police commissioner Ng Joo Hee also attended the funeral to offer his condolences to the family.

According to The Straits Times, the unnamed widow of Chee Heong, was devastated and inconsolable as her husband's coffin was pushed into the cremation chambers of Mandai Crematorium, and Chee Heong's unnamed elder son, who only received news of his father's death a few days later, also teared up when it was his turn to carry his father's photo while the younger son innocently waved at the coffins and say goodbye to his father. Ong Ah Tang, the widow of Boon Sin, with whom she was married for 40 years, was too distraught to take part in the Buddhist funeral rites. 39-year-old Tan Chee Wee, the younger son of Boon Sin, tearfully made a promise to his father and brother in Hokkien that he will take on the responsibility to take care of the family, and to treat his brother's children as his own. Even the teachers and counsellors from the school of Chee Heong's elder son were sent to help the Primary Four student and his family to cope through the double loss and difficult time they suffered. The drawings made by Chee Heong's two sons were placed in the two victims' coffins before they were cremated. 49-year-old Ong Boon Kok, an uncle of Chee Heong, also thanked the police for their part in investigations and the members of the public (including the eye-witnesses) who assisted in investigations, as well as the people who helped the family to cope through their sufferings.

On 26 July 2013, Iskandar was remanded at the Changi Prison Complex Medical Centre for psychiatric evaluation. He also reportedly told his lawyers that he wanted to claim trial to all the charges against him.

== Iskandar bin Rahmat ==
Iskandar bin Rahmat, a Singaporean, was born on 3 February 1979. He was the only son of his family and had a sister. Not much is known about Iskandar's childhood or early life before his career and the murders. It is inferred from his Facebook page (which was eventually deleted) that he was very close to his family and that he also had a grandmother who died in 2009; an unnamed family friend told Channel NewsAsia that Iskandar was single and worked to support his family financially. Iskandar was known to have a hobby of collecting vintage bikes (including the scooter which he used to flee Singapore). After completing his 4-year secondary school education and O-levels at Victoria School, Iskandar was enrolled in Singapore Polytechnic, where he studied for a year before dropping out. He then went on to serve National Service in the Singapore Police Force (SPF) and in March 1999, he formally joined the force as a corporal.

Iskandar served with the Bedok Police Division and in 2007, Iskandar successfully applied to become an investigation officer. The SPF sponsored his diploma studies in management and police studies in Temasek Polytechnic, which he completed in 2012. He was an investigation officer until January 2013 and was said to have performed well in his work and received many commendations. A letter of appreciation from a Bedok resident had once praised Iskandar for his "outstanding work" when the resident filed a complaint about "noise pollution" in the neighbourhood and how Iskandar managed it well. This also led to the commanding officer praising him as "deserving of being the pride of Bedok North NPC". By the time of the double homicide case in Kovan, Iskandar had attained a rank of senior staff sergeant in the SPF.

Iskandar was said to be crippled by debt and in deep financial trouble before and at the time of the murders. The debt was incurred from his previous marriage with an unnamed woman in 2003, where he made three bank loans – a housing loan, a renovation loan, and a car loan – from Oversea-Chinese Banking Corporation (OCBC), which amounted to a few hundred thousand in SGD. After his divorce in early 2005, Iskandar sold his car and HDB flat to pay off some of his debts, and went to live with his parents and sister in a three-room flat at Kim Keat Avenue, and he also went on to pay off his debt by part-payments. As of June 2013, Iskandar owed the bank about S$61,599.66. A bankruptcy application was filed against Iskandar on 4 October 2012 and it was served on him at his workplace on 25 October 2012. In January 2013, Iskandar failed to declare his financial situation and difficulties like he did annually (it is a requirement for civil servants in Singapore to declare annually that they are not financially embarrassed like facing debt or undischarged bankruptcy). This led to disciplinary hearings held against Iskandar, and as a result, he was reassigned to perform administrative duties and barred from carrying arms. He was also given three months to settle his debts.

According to Iskandar's superior Senior Station Inspector Nurussufyan bin Ali, Iskandar appeared confident of clearing his debt. Iskandar's performance at work was unaffected by the disciplinary hearings and investigations, said Nurussufyan, who described Iskandar as "a good worker, efficient and knowledgable". Deputy superintendent (DSP) Borhan bin Said, Iskandar's disciplinary officer, also testified that he reminded Iskandar of prioritising over paying off his debts when he heard that Iskandar went on a hajj pilgrimage to Mecca despite his debts, claiming that he told Iskandar that he could have used the money he spent on the pilgrimage to pay off his debt, which amounted to more than three times his own salary. Despite the financial pressure, Iskandar never once discussed these to his family, girlfriend, and acquaintances, and maintained a cheerful outlook to people known to him.

An out-of-court settlement was offered by Iskandar to the bank's lawyer on 3 July 2013, in which he would make a full payment of $50,000. It was agreed, but Iskandar was ordered to pay it the next day. Later on, it was negotiated that Iskandar would pay the agreed amount by 11 July 2013 if he want to avoid bankruptcy. However, Iskandar did not pay by that deadline, hence he was declared bankrupt on 11 July, the day after he killed Tan Boon Sin and Tan Chee Heong.

At the same time, due to his financial embarrassment, Iskandar faced a possible dismissal from the police force. Iskandar told the officers in his disciplinary hearing that he would borrow money from his cousin to pay off the debt (in fact, Iskandar did not have a cousin). The officer in charge had also mentioned to Iskandar that discharging his debts would help mitigate the consequences if he was found guilty of his failure to declare his financial problems. It was then Iskandar recalled that Tan Boon Sin had made a police report in November 2012 over a case of theft in his safety deposit box at Certis Cisco, and he was the investigating officer before the case was reassigned to another police officer. Out of desperation, Iskandar decided to form a plan to rob the old man of his money in order to pay off his debts.

== Trial ==
=== Pre-trial conferences ===
On 6 September 2013, it was reported that Iskandar was assessed to be not of unsound mind and fit to plead and stand trial. His first pre-trial conference was set on 24 September after Iskandar undergone a further psychiatric examination while in remand. After the first pre-trial conference, Iskandar's lawyers told newspapers that Iskandar was likely to stand trial after March 2014, and another pre-trial conference was set in January 2014, due to the large number of court exhibits and police evidence sent for DNA analysis and the test results would only come out by then.

On 19 October 2015, it was confirmed that Iskandar would officially go to trial on 20 October 2015.

=== Beginning of Kovan double murder trial ===
The Kovan double murder trial began on 20 October 2015. Iskandar stood trial for the double charges of murder, which came under Section 300(a) of the Penal Code, which constitutes an offence of first-degree murder with intention to kill, and thus carries the mandatory death penalty if found guilty. Iskandar, whose case was heard before High Court judge Tay Yong Kwang of the High Court, was represented by a defence counsel of six lawyers, led by Mr Shashi Nathan. The trial received significant media attention, and there were 16 out of more than 100 witnesses testifying in the trial. Many members of the public, including law students, reporters and curious onlookers came to the court to witness the proceedings in the Kovan double murder trial.

=== Forensic evidence and murder weapon ===
One of these witnesses, was associate professor and senior forensic consultant pathologist Dr Gilbert Lau from the Health Sciences Authority (HSA), who conducted an autopsy on the deceased father and son. Dr Lau testified in court that the elder victim Tan Boon Sin sustained 12 stab wounds and 15 incised wounds, which included five wounds to the neck, seven to the chest and nine to the face or scalp. All the wounds were likely to have been inflicted by a sharp instrument like a knife. What caused the elderly man's death were a deep and gaping incised wound that measured 8 cm by 5 cm across the front of the neck, which would have caused severe bleeding, and a 13 cm deep chest wound. There were four defensive wounds on the arms of the elder victim, and some defensive injuries on his fingers.

As for the younger victim Tan Chee Heong, he sustained seven stab wounds and 13 incised wounds. There were four wounds to the neck and 13 to the face or scalp. A deep neck wound on Chee Heong, which measured 7 to 8 cm deep and had cut through three major blood vessels, was the injury that killed him. He had three defensive wounds on his forearm and also some injuries that resulted from the dragging by the car. Chee Heong's tooth was found outside the house, though it is not known how it was dislodged. When asked about the sequence of injuries inflicted, Dr Lau reportedly replied, "Stabbings are just so dynamic. Various injuries could have been inflicted in various ways. It is very difficult to determine the precise sequence... it may be possible on CSI, but not in real life."

As he was testifying and presenting his autopsy findings in court on the third day of the trial (26 October 2015), Dr Lau faced a severe cross-examination from defence lawyer Shashi Nathan, who put it to him that Iskandar had done the stabbing out of self-defence, which the pathologist rejected on the stand. Dr Lau, in return, stated that should it be the case that Boon Sin indeed attacked Iskandar, he would have conducted an autopsy on Iskandar instead. He said it would really require the inquiry of why Iskandar did the stabbing for twelve times instead of once, twice or thrice, labelling it as an excessive form of self-defence.

Iskandar described that the knife used to stab the victims was a normal kitchen knife; he said that the knife had a grooved blade. From the handle to the tip, it was slightly shorter than the breadth of an A4-sized piece of paper. He also drew a sketch of what the knife looked like, drawing many small circles along the entire length of the cutting edge. He would later on say in his defence that the elder victim Tan Boon Sin used it to attack him when discovering his plan to rob him, and that he did not arm himself with a knife. However, the knives owned by the Tan family were all flat-edged. The fishing knives owned by Boon Sin, who liked to go fishing, were also too short. The murder weapon as described by Iskandar was never recovered, even from the location where Iskandar told police he disposed the weapon, as well as his bloodstained clothes. It was the case of the prosecution, from the above evidence, that the knife belonged to Iskandar and he armed himself with it to commit robbery and murder; however the defence argued that Iskandar was never armed and for the issue of who owned that particular knife, the defence lawyers representing Iskandar had subjected Boon Sin's widow Mdm Ong Ah Tang to extensive cross-examination.

Regarding the issue of the knife while Dr Lau took the stand, Deputy Public Prosecutor Lau Wing Yum (unrelated to Dr Gilbert Lau) of the Attorney-General's Chambers (AGC), who led the 4-member prosecution team, asked Dr Lau if the alleged murder knife could have caused the injuries. Dr Lau said that it could cause most of the injuries, but if the sketch was up to scale, the 9.2 cm-long blade would not have been able to cause two wounds on the older Mr Tan that were 11 cm and 13 cm deep. He also did not rule out the possibility of two knives being used during the murders, when cross-examined by the defence counsel.

=== Iskandar's version of the case ===
On 29 October 2015, Iskandar elected to put up his defence. On the stand, the former police officer's recount of the events was consistent with his police statements, and he maintained that the deaths were a result of a poorly conceived robbery that gone wrong. He claimed that his intention was only to rob Tan Boon Sin by cheating him, grab the money and run. He also stated he was sorry and regretful for killing the victims. He recounted that day when he contacted Boon Sin, he introduced himself as Rahman instead of his real name Iskandar bin Rahmat, and pretended to be an intelligence officer wanting to conduct a sting operation to help Boon Sin catch the thief. He then took a dummy surveillance camera with him and a wristlet before meeting up with Boon Sin, whom he convinced to take out his valuables from the Certis Cisco and at the place, he installed the dummy surveillance camera and offered to escort Boon Sin back home; on the way he pretended to be talking to his "partner" on a fake walkie-talkie, which was made out of the wristlet he took from his home. A witness named Hor Boon Long confirmed this when he testified on the first day of the trial that he saw Iskandar together on the car with Boon Sin when Boon Sin's car cut in ahead of him in a queue of cars leaving a petrol station to the road, leading to him alighting his car to confront the men and thus saw what he told the court in his testimony.

After this, the then police officer and Boon Sin reached Boon Sin's house in Hillside Drive, where Boon Sin offered Iskandar a drink and Iskandar stayed on to smoke while waiting for an opportunity to steal the money while the old man was not looking and maintaining the facade that his "partner" was on the way. It was at this juncture when Iskandar claimed, his ploy was later seen through and as a result, Boon Sin turned aggressive and went at him with a knife. Iskandar claimed that he acted in self-defence out of fear for his life and fatally injured Boon Sin, who collapsed next to the house's organ.

The younger victim Tan Chee Heong, who had just arrived at his father's home, had discovered the murder of his father. At the sight of his father's body and Iskandar, Chee Heong went at Iskandar, who turned around and saw Chee Heong after hearing someone calling the word "Pa", and out of panic, Iskandar claimed that he swung the knife wildly and was engaged in a sudden fight with Chee Heong. Iskandar stabbed him out of self-defence. Chee Heong collapsed after he staggered out of the house through the gates. Iskandar then quickly get onto Boon Sin's car and used it a get-away to escape the house; unknowingly to Iskandar, the belt of the younger Tan was caught under the car, which led to the dragging of the younger victim's body for 1 km before its complete dislodge at Kovan MRT station. He thought that the cars honked at him due to the bloodstains on the side of the car.

On the day of the killings, Iskandar's superior received a request from Iskandar for urgent leave because he wanted to meet up with his cousin, which the superior agreed to and asked Iskandar to update him about it. The next day, through WhatsApp, Iskandar informed his superior that he fled to Malaysia because he knew he would be made a bankrupt, and wanted to resign from the police force despite attempts by the superior to dissuade him. The superior was said to be shocked over Iskandar's arrest for the alleged murders he committed at Kovan.

According to Iskandar's police statements, during the two days on the run, he went to seek treatment for his wound on his right hand in a clinic in Johor. After lying to the doctor that the injury was a result of knocking into a lamp post while falling off his motorcycle, the doctor sutured his wounds and prescribed some antibiotics for him. Other than that, Iskandar spent his time living in hotels in Johor Bahru before his arrest at Restoran Singgah Selalu.

=== The defence's arguments ===
Iskandar's lawyer Shashi Nathan argued about his client's lack of intention to kill, urging the court to accept both his defences of a sudden fight and self-defence and to convict him of a lesser charge of culpable homicide not amounting to murder, which carries the penalty of life imprisonment or up to 20 years' imprisonment, with the offender liable to caning or a fine. He said that, even if Iskandar had exceeded his right to self-defence and had committed murder, he should be convicted of a lesser limb of third-degree murder with lack of intention to kill under Section 300(c) of the Penal Code, which constitutes an act where a person intentionally inflict a bodily injury on another person, and the bodily injury itself is sufficient in the ordinary cause of nature to cause death, for which the punishment is either a sentence of death or life imprisonment with/without caning.

"I'm not asking you to acquit him of murder. He knows he has killed two people. He knows he has to suffer the consequences," Nathan told the court. "He did intend to cause injuries to get away from them... He never intended to kill them." Additionally, Nathan also said that the large number of injuries did not necessarily mean an intention to kill. He noted that there was no concrete evidence to show that his client had armed himself beforehand and the benefit of the doubt must be given to his client. He pointed out that if Iskandar had been searching the house, his bloodstained sock prints would be in all directions but in this case, they were in a linear path.

=== The prosecution's arguments ===
As for the prosecution's case, the events before the murders were largely similar to that of the defence's case, and to Iskandar's police statements. However, DPP Lau Wing Yum argued that the double killings were premeditated. They argued that Iskandar should be convicted as charged for committing murder with intention to kill. They pointed out that Iskandar had intended to commit murder by arming himself with a knife, and that the number of stab wounds on the body, the location of the knife wounds (on the head, chest and neck), and the nature of these injuries were altogether an irreversible indication that Iskandar had intended to kill and silence the victims should his plot be discovered. They argued that the trail of sock prints could only mean that Iskandar had gone to search for the valuables after killing Boon Sin before the arrival of Chee Heong (as there was only Boon Sin's DNA found on the sock prints) instead of looking for a towel to clean himself as what he claimed in the statements. They also claimed that Iskandar in fact hid in ambush and waited for Chee Heong to enter the house before killing him.

They pointed out that Tan Boon Sin has a completely degenerated cartilage at his right knee, which made him having difficulty to walk or getting up from a sitting position (it was earlier revealed that Boon Sin was due to go for a knee operation not long after 10 July 2013, according to Boon Sin's orthopaedic surgeon Dr Kevin Lee). Despite the fact that his weight and height was comparatively close to those of Iskandar's, Boon Sin was much older than Iskandar, which made him a whole lot less agile in his lower limb movements. This also shown that Boon Sin could not have possibly been able to charge at Iskandar. Besides, in Chee Heong's case, even though he was 4 cm taller than the 173-cm-tall Iskandar, Chee Heong, whose weight is 56 kg, was 27 kg lighter than Iskandar, whose weight is 83 kg, so there is no doubt that the harm done was excessive for self-defence since Chee Heong was not really physically threatening to him.

The prosecutors also pointed out the absence of defensive wounds on Iskandar, other than a superficial bite wound on his left hand (left by Boon Sin before his death) and a deep cut on his right palm, has further disputed the defence of self-defence or sudden fight. The prosecution also conceded that even if there was no intention to kill from the start, this formed when the plan began to fall apart which might risk expose his identity and robbery plan. Iskandar's lack of explanation of why he inflict so many wounds on the victims and the inconsistencies between his account and the objective evidence were also included in the arguments of the prosecution in favour of a conviction of murder.

After a nine-day trial, the defence and prosecution made their closing submissions on 23 November 2015, and the judgement was reserved until 4 December 2015.

=== Verdict ===
On 4 December 2015, more than 2 years after the deaths of both Tan Boon Sin and Tan Chee Heong in Kovan, Justice Tay Yong Kwang delivered his verdict, with around 60 people (including the victims' families and Iskandar's family) sitting in the courtroom to hear it. Justice Tay found Iskandar bin Rahmat guilty of murder under Section 300(a) of the Penal Code, and sentenced him to death. In convicting Iskandar of murder, Justice Tay found that he had attacked the victims "cruelly and relentlessly with the clear intention of causing death" as shown by the wounds found on the vital areas of the victims' corpses. He did not believe that Boon Sin, a generally calm and mild-tempered person, would suddenly turn aggressive and wield a knife after welcoming Iskandar to his home. He also said that Chee Heong was "collateral damage" and Iskandar killed him to silence him for witnessing the murder of his father.

Justice Tay thus rejected the defences put up by Iskandar, and he also pointed out in the judgement that there are four golden opportunities for Iskandar to be able to grab the money and run without having to attract the attention of Boon Sin if it was true that he indeed had no intent to hurt anyone or merely to just take the money and run. Justice Tay also found that Iskandar was actually armed beforehand since he was precise with the description of the knife, meaning he had time to observe it before it became stained with blood during Iskandar's murderous rampage. The judge also said that Iskandar's plan to rob Boon Sin was "foolhardly" since it involved many contingencies. Despite his dismissal of Iskandar's account and defence, he did accept that Iskandar did not ambush Chee Heong and kill him based on the review of the forensic evidence and that he had no intention of using the car as a "mean murder machine" to deliberately get Chee Heong's body to be dragged under the car to kill him while he drove it to escape the crime scene.

Nearing the end of his judgement, Justice Tay commended the police officers in charge of the investigation for their part in the swift arrest of Iskandar (as assisted by the Royal Malaysian Police), and their unbiasedness and objective attitudes in the investigations of the double deaths at Kovan despite the accused being a police officer. He also gratefully addressed both the prosecution and the defence for their efforts, professional attitude and conduct in the course of the trial, allowing the trial's conclusion to take place within a short period of time.

Iskandar was reportedly emotionless as the High Court found him guilty and convict him of the murders. Justice Tay pronounced and passed the mandatory death sentence on Iskandar as everyone in the court was told to stand and keep silent while the judge did so. Shashi Nathan later confirmed that his client would be appealing against his sentence and conviction.

=== Reactions to the High Court verdict ===
On 8 December 2015, 4 days after the conclusion of the murder trial, a press conference was held by the bereaved Tan family. Tan Boon Sin's 42-year-old daughter Tan Siew Ling, son Tan Chee Wee and their uncle Ong Boon Kok spoke to reporters from the Straits Times in the Hillside Drive house (where the murders took place), telling them about their feelings towards the case. Chee Wee said that the verdict was expected but its outcome could not heal the pain continually endured by the family from the incident, and in his words, he reportedly said, "A happy family was broken in seconds. Life has changed for us totally." The widow of Boon Sin, who was not present at the time of the media interview, continued to live alone in the house after the murders. The family also expressed their gratitude to the police officers and the prosecution for bringing Iskandar to justice, as well as the kindness and condolences of many strangers. Boon Sin's widow was reported to have been struggling with accepting the deaths of her husband and son, and had not made any reaction to the Kovan murder verdict.

As for Iskandar's family, it was reported that they were saddened to hear that Iskandar was sentenced to death for the double murder. Iskandar's friends, who were also present in the courtroom when Iskandar was sentenced, were also equally saddened at the sentence.

== Appeal ==
=== Hearing of the appeal ===
On 26 October 2016, Iskandar's appeal was heard in the Court of Appeal, before three judges, Chief Justice Sundaresh Menon and Judges of Appeal Chao Hick Tin and Andrew Phang. The newly appointed defence counsel (led by defence lawyer Wendell Wong) presented the arguments which were made in the original trial to the Court of Appeal. Not only did they raised the original defences of sudden fight and self-defence, they also raised a new defence of diminished responsibility by submitting a psychiatric report that diagnosed that Iskandar was suffering from adjustment disorder and acute stress reaction at the time of the murders, and he was depressed by his potential bankruptcy and dismissal from the police force. The prosecution, in turn, argued that the medical report is ought to be rejected, describing it as "self-serving". The judgement was reserved until 3 February 2017.

=== Appeal dismissed ===
On 3 February 2017, the same day when Iskandar celebrated his 38th birthday, the Court of Appeal released their decision, with Justice Andrew Phang delivering the court's decision. By a unanimous decision, the Court of Appeal dismissed Iskandar's appeal, and upheld his death sentence. The three-judge panel found Iskandar had intended to kill both Tan Boon Sin and Tan Chee Heong and described his account as "incredible" and "unbelievable". Justice Phang read out, "Even if his incredible account of a rob-and-run ploy were true, any right of self-defence belonged to the younger victim [Tan Chee Heong], who came home to the sight of his slain and bloodied father on the floor." He stressed in the court's judgement that the intention of murder "need not be pre-planned or premeditated, and can be formed on the spur of the moment". Like Justice Tay Yong Kwang in the original trial, they rejected Iskandar's defences of sudden fight and self-defence. Especially on the part of the younger victim, Justice Phang said that "[Chee Heong] had just witnessed [Iskandar] lowering his father's limp and bloodied body on the floor. Furthermore, [Iskandar], who was much heavier than [Chee Heong], was still holding on to the knife at the time. It would have been only natural for [Chee Heong] to try and apprehend [Iskandar] and defend his father".

The judges also rejected the newly raised defence of diminished responsibility, questioning why it was not brought up in the original trial or during Iskandar's time of psychiatric remand. They said, "Accused persons should and are expected to put their best case forward at the earliest time possible. Indeed, this court might exercise its discretion to reject such drip-feed applications in the future". After hearing the appeal verdict, Iskandar was given the chance to speak to his 16 family members and friends, including his parents and sister. Some of them wept. The family declined to speak to the media, and the victims' families were not present to hear the decision.

== Subsequent legal proceedings ==
=== Clemency petition and outcome ===
After the dismissal of his appeal, Iskandar filed for clemency from the President of Singapore in January 2018. Similarly, in February 2018, Iskandar's family also filed for clemency in hopes to have his death sentence commuted to life imprisonment. Both petitions were received by the President's Office to be reviewed and considered.

In July 2019, more than 18 months after the submission of the clemency petitions, the Istana Office informed Iskandar's new lawyer, Mr Peter Ong that President Halimah Yacob, on the advice of the Cabinet, decided to dismiss Iskandar's clemency plea, which effectively finalized Iskandar's death sentence and thus condemning the former police officer to hang for the Kovan double murders.

When asked about the outcome of the clemency petition, Mr Ong said to the newspaper The Straits Times, "This has been a very challenging task, given the circumstances of the case, and I tried my best."

=== Allegations of former legal counsel's misconduct ===
Simultaneously, while he was under a sentence of death and awaiting the outcome of his clemency application, Iskandar filed a complaint against his original lawyers to have them subject to disciplinary tribunal for not handling the case ethically and properly. But it was dismissed by the Law Society of Singapore (LawSoc) in June 2019. Later on, Iskandar filed an appeal against this decision to the High Court, asking for a review of LawSoc's decision, but the High Court dismissed the appeal in October 2019. The judgement for this appeal to the High Court was released on 28 February 2020. Inside the judgement, High Court judge Valerie Thean, who heard the appeal, commented that the ex-police officer's "true discontentment, it seemed, was that the trial defence team had not prolonged his trial by use of all means imagined.". She also said that there is "no prima facie case of ethical breach or other misconduct" in the case of Iskandar's former lawyers to warrant a formal investigation on them.

On 8 January 2021, it was reported that Iskandar was given an approval by the Court of Appeal to proceed with his appeal against the High Court's decision to dismiss his allegations of his former lawyers' misconduct, as the court ruled that the complainants who are pursuing disciplinary probes against lawyers have the right to appeal all the way to Singapore's highest court as they dismissed the application by LawSoc to strike out Iskandar's appeal. The appeal was heard on 5 July 2021, and it was then decided by the Court of Appeal that the appeal should be dismissed, as there was no merit and the three appeal judges found no indication of misconduct in Iskandar's former six lawyers. The date of Iskandar's loss of appeal was happened to be five days away from the eighth death anniversaries of both the Kovan murder victims.

=== Legal challenge against the forwarding of letters by prisons to AGC ===
Besides the proceedings against his lawyers, Iskandar was also involved in another proceeding. The proceeding was about Iskandar's claims that the private letters between the death row inmates and both their lawyers and families were being forwarded from prisons to the Attorney General's Chambers of Singapore (AGC), and it led to these said inmates pursuing legal proceedings against the AGC or its members for alleged breaches of conduct to protect the inmates' rights, misconduct in public office and seeking damages for any harm caused by such. Iskandar, together with 21 other death row inmates (most of whom sentenced for drug trafficking), were represented by human rights lawyer M Ravi to seek the identities of whoever ordered or carried out the sending of the inmates' information to the AGC.

The lawsuit was dismissed on 16 March 2021. High Court judge See Kee Oon ruled that although it may be allowed for prisons to make copies of the inmates' correspondence for screening and recording letters, they were not allowed to forward them to the AGC. Unless a prisoner consented so, the AGC will be denied access to these sources. However, the judge said that it was a mistake which the AGC had inadvertently overlooked instead of an attempt to gain advantage in the court proceedings. The judge said that the lawsuit ought to not be dealt with in the courts but in the Law Society's Disciplinary Tribunal as the inmates' lawsuits "may potentially have a cause of action against the Government through a civil action filed against the AG", citing the potential risk should pre-action disclosures are allowed to be made against the Government. In his own words, Justice See said, "In my view, if pre-action disclosures could be ordered against the Government, it would conceivably create a situation where it could be easier to obtain information from the Government via pre-action disclosures than via the conventional discovery processes associated with judicial review."

The inmates, including Iskandar, are ordered to pay $10 in costs for the lawsuit.

Still, it was not the end of the story for Iskandar and 12 other prisoners out of the 22 plaintiffs, as they have filed civil suits against the Attorney-General of Singapore for this issue and asked for the High Court to declare the forwarding of letters to the AG as unlawful.

On 11 October 2024, the Court of Appeal's three judges – Chief Justice Sundaresh Menon, Senior Judge Judith Prakash and Justice Steven Chong – ruled that the AGC and SPS unlawfully breached the confidentiality of letters from 13 death-row inmates. The judges emphasized the importance of prisoners' rights to maintain confidential correspondence, particularly with legal counsel. Although SPS and AGC justified their actions by stating they needed legal advice, the court found no need to share these letters. The court also upheld nominal damages for copyright breach but denied any compensation for breach of confidence.

=== Constitutionality challenge against Section 300(a) of the Penal Code ===
On 5 July 2021, the same day Iskandar lost his appeal over his former lawyers' disciplinary issues, Iskandar's lawyer M Ravi confirmed that Iskandar would file a lawsuit to challenge the constitutionality of first-degree murder under Section 300(a) of the Penal Code, which was the same offence Iskandar was found guilty of for causing the deaths of both Tan Boon Sin and Tan Chee Heong. Under this section, it was automatically a death sentence if found guilty. Ravi claimed that it violated Iskandar's rights to equality under the law by saying, "(Section 300(a)) does not provide judges with any discretion in terms of sentencing, and this violates equality before the law when the same is available for culpable homicide under Section 299 of the Penal Code."

Iskandar tried to apply for himself to participate in the appeal of Teo Ghim Heng, a former property agent who was on death row for the unrelated 2017 Woodlands double murders, so as to provide arguments in support of Teo's constitutionality challenge and to favour his own challenge. The application, however, was disapproved since Iskandar's crime was not related to that of Teo, and the rights to making arguments in Teo's appeal should be reserved to Teo and his defence counsel only. Iskandar's complete exhaustion of his avenues of appeal would make the application unmeritorious if allowed by the appellate court, hence the Court of Appeal dismissed it.

=== Appeal against denial of counsel ===
On 4 August 2022, an appeal was made by Iskandar and 23 other death row prisoners (including Abdul Rahim Shapiee who was hanged the next day on 5 August 2022), who brought forward claims that there were miscarriages of justice in their cases as they were denied their access to legal counsel and had their preparations of appeal hindered, as a result of the strict court orders and penalties against any lawyers who repeatedly made appeals without merit. However, these allegations were not accepted by the courts as the lawsuit was "plainly unsustainable and unmeritorious", and the courts stated that there may have been "perfectly valid and legitimate reasons" why lawyers declined to take up the inmates' cases apart from costs orders, and hence, the basis that lawyers were threatened by the court penalties to not take up these cases and argue the appeals that contained no merit were not supported at all by concrete evidence.

=== Legal challenge against Pacc Act ===
In December 2023, Iskandar and 35 other death row inmates filed an appeal to challenge the newly enacted Post-Appeal Applications in Capital Cases Act (Pacc Act), which was designed to oversee the last-minute appeals made by death row convicts who had used up all avenues of appeal. The 36 plaintiffs argued that the new law was discriminatory against death row inmates and it would hinder the last chances of the convicts' access to justice, which also violated the need for fairness during the legal proceedings. However, Justice Hoo Sheau Peng of the High Court dismissed the motion, citing that the law was passed due to the rising number of inmates filing last-minute appeals before their executions and abusing of court processes, and it can be used to distinguish and dismiss any appeals that were made without merit. Justice Hoo also said that the legal rights of the plaintiffs were not violated by the provisions of the Paccc Act, since the law was not passed for enforcement yet. A follow-up appeal by the same 36 plaintiffs was dismissed by the Court of Appeal on 27 March 2024.

=== Legal challenge against LASCO ===
On 9 May 2024, Iskandar and another 35 death row prisoners appealed to the High Court, arguing that the policy of the Legal Assistance Scheme for Capital Offences (LASCO) was not to assign counsel for death row inmates who filed further legal motions after exhausting their avenues of appeal against capital punishment and conviction, and this infringed the need to uphold fairness of court processes and constitutional rights of the prisoners, as well as breaching their access to justice and right to legal representation. However, 11 days after the appeal was filed, Justice Dedar Singh Gill found there was no reasonable cause of action and dismissed the motion, as the LASCO was "perfectly entitled to adopt or change its policy regarding its provision of legal aid", and there could have been multiple reasons for LASCO to not assign lawyers for such convicts, such as the need to allocate resources to aid new defendants who were facing trial and appeal and deter possible abuse of court processes. The judge also stated that the lack of representation from LASCO in post-appeal applications did not deprive the accused persons of their right to life or personal liberty, which was especially so since all the plaintiffs in this case were already convicted and sentenced at this stage, and also exhausted their appeals against conviction and/or sentence, and their rights to access to justice were not violated by the lack of free legal representation, given that they still had the entitlement to engage lawyers on their own accord in any post-appeal applications. Aside from this, Justice Gill said while the applicants should not be deterred from filing applications with merit to prevent the miscarriage of justice, but any motions launched "at an eleventh hour and without merit" should be regarded as a "stopgap" measure to delay the carrying out of the offender's death sentence. On these grounds, Justice Gill rejected the appeal.

== Execution ==
On 5 February 2025, two days after his 46th birthday, Iskandar Rahmat was hanged in Changi Prison. According to court sources, Iskandar filed a second petition for clemency on 17 November 2024, but President Tharman Shanmugaratnam rejected the plea prior to his execution. The Court of Appeal also rejected Iskandar's petition for a stay of execution on the eve of his hanging.

Iskandar's execution in 2025 was noted to be unusual as his sentencing took place nearly ten years before in 2015, and that he lost his direct appeal and clemency plea in 2017 and 2019 respectively. Typically, a condemned inmate in Singapore would be hanged around a few weeks or two months after losing their clemency plea, but Iskandar's execution was delayed for at least five times and took another six years to come due to his multiple legal challenges against capital punishment and a complaint alleging the misconduct of his former trial lawyers.

In response to the execution of Iskandar, Tan Boon Sin's daughter, who had since took over her father's car workshop, stated that for the past 12 years, her family had mostly stayed away from the topic of the murders of her older brother and father, and they left it to the courts to decide on the case, even though they never expected the appellate process to last so long before the courts. Boon Sin's daughter also said that her mother was still in good health and they hoped to move on after the hanging of Iskandar, which was relayed to the family by the Criminal Investigation Department before it was carried out. Boon Sin's daughter also said that she ran her father's shop as a way to continue her father's legacy, and she also became a parental figure to Chee Heong's two sons after her brother died.

A veteran employee of Tan Boon Sin's workplace also stated that he was greatly relieved at the execution of Iskandar after 12 years of waiting for justice to be served, and the 66-year-old Malaysian-born employee, who had worked with Tan since the age of 21 after moving from Malaysia, stated that he never forgotten about the case and he struggled to move on for the first five to six years after the murders, and he revealed that many of the regular customers had been inquiring him about the fate of Iskandar. A neighbour of the Tan family also stated that Iskandar deserved to hang for the double murder and that justice was achieved.

== See also ==
- Capital punishment in Singapore
- List of major crimes in Singapore
- Andrew Road triple murders
- Gold Bars triple murders
- Toa Payoh ritual murders
- Murder of Nonoi
- 2010 Kallang slashings
- Murder of Huang Na
- Oriental Hotel murder
