= Jair Rosa =

Uruguayan footballer (born 1975)

Personal information
- Full name: Jair Rosa Pereyra
- Date of birth: November 6, 1975 (age 50)
- Place of birth: Montevideo, Uruguay
- Height: 1.75 m (5 ft 9 in)
- Position: Forward

Senior career*
Years	Team	Apps	(Gls)
1998	La Luz		
2000	Rocha		
2004	Coban Imperial		
2005	CD Heredia		
2005–2006	Deportivo Jalapa		
2007	Deportivo Armenio	1	(0)
2007–2008	River Plate (Uruguay)	5	(0)
- * Club domestic league appearances and goals

Jair Rosa (full name Jair Rosa Pereyra, born November 6, 1975, in Montevideo) is a former Uruguayan footballer. He last played for River Plate in Uruguayan First Division.
