= Eugene Thuraisingam =

Singaporean lawyer

Eugene Singarajah Thuraisingam
- Born: 10 June 1975 (age 51); Singapore
- Education: Bachelor of Laws
- Alma mater: National University of Singapore
- Occupation: Lawyer
- Known for: International arbitration Commercial litigation Criminal litigation Public Interest litigation
- Children: 3
- Website: https://thuraisingam.com/

Eugene Singarajah Thuraisingam (born 10 June 1975) is a Singaporean lawyer. He is the founder of the law firm Eugene Thuraisingam LLP, a law firm that specialises in international arbitration and criminal and commercial litigation. He is also known for his advocacy of human rights and for his opposition of the death penalty in Singapore. In relation to his domestic practice as a criminal lawyer in Singapore, Thuraisingam has defended many alleged suspects in high profile criminal trials, including those who were dissidents and critics of the government of Singapore. For his legal service for many defendants in the court of Singapore, Doyles Guide has named him as a leading criminal defence lawyer in Singapore in 2020.

== Education and career ==
Thuraisingam, who was born in Singapore in 1975, attended Anglo-Chinese School (Independent) and graduated with a Bachelor of Laws from the National University of Singapore, where he was placed on the Dean's List in his final year of study.

After he was admitted to the Singapore Bar in 2001, Thuraisingam practised law at Allen & Gledhill for nine years and at Stamford Law Corporation for another three years before he founded his own law firm, Eugene Thuraisingam LLP (ET LLP), in 2012.

ET LLP was named as one of the top two criminal law firms in Singapore in the inaugural Singapore's Best Law Firms 2021 undertaken by The Straits Times and German-based research firm Statista.

In 2021 and in conjunction of ET LLP's 9th anniversary and in partnership with the Law Society Pro Bono Services (LSPBS), SGD 100,000 was raised for LSPBS' campaign, 'inclusive justice', which supports LSPBS' court representation schemes for foreigners in areas of criminal legal aid, matrimonial matters and more. Thuraisingam intends for this to be an annual event to raise funds for LSPBS.

== Cases taken by Thuraisingam ==
=== Nagaenthran Dharmalingam ===
In May 2019, Thuraisingam represented Malaysian drug trafficker Nagaenthran K. Dharmalingam in his appeal for re-sentencing. Nagaenthran, who was on death row since 2010 for trafficking over 42g of heroin, submitted his appeal for re-sentencing after the 2013 changes to the death penalty laws (which allows life imprisonment for drug convicts with diminished responsibility), and in the appeal, Thuraisingam argued that Nagaenthran has low IQ and was thus intellectually disabled, therefore qualifying his for the defence of diminished responsibility and the death penalty should be commuted to life imprisonment. However, the psychiatrists from both the defence and prosecution confirmed that Nagaenthran was not intellectually disabled and he fully understood the full magnitude of his actions. Therefore he was denied re-sentencing by the Court of Appeal. Nagaenthran, who was later defended by another lawyer in his later appeals, was executed on 27 April 2022 despite international appeals for clemency.

=== Woodlands double murder ===
In July 2019, Thuraisingam represented former property agent Teo Ghim Heng, who was charged with the murders of his pregnant wife Choong Pei Shan and their daughter Zi Ning at their Woodlands flat during the final week before the Chinese New Year of 2017. Thuraisingam argued in the trial that Teo was suffering from major depressive disorder which impaired his mental responsibility during the commission of the offences, and he also put up the defence of sudden and grave provocation, since Teo recounted he was arguing violently with his wife over their precarious financial situation and Zi Ning's overdue school fees before he used a towel to strangle both Choong and Zi Ning. However, Teo was found guilty of murder and sentenced to death, because both the High Court and Court of Appeal rejected Thuraisingam's arguments and Teo's defences, based on the fact that Teo knew perfectly what he was doing and his mental condition was normal and not impaired at the time he committed the murders. Eight years after murdering Choong and Zi Ning, Teo Ghim Heng was hanged in Changi Prison on 16 April 2025.

=== 2016 Toa Payoh child abuse case ===
In November 2019, Thuraisingam represented Ridzuan Mega Abdul Rahman, an unemployed man who was jointly charged with his wife Azlin Arujunah for abusing and murdering his five-year-old son, who was fatally scalded to death after four scalding incidents over a week leading up to the boy's death. Thuraisingam presented evidence of Ridzuan having low IQ and intermittent explosive disorder among several psychiatric disorders to support his client's defence of diminished responsibility, and made arguments to create reasonable doubt over whether Ridzuan had knowledge that his scalding of his child (not named due to a gag order) would lead to the boy's death. While the psychiatric evidence did not hold much weight in favour of Ridzuan's case, Thuraisingam's efforts had seen partial success as the High Court acquitted Ridzuan of murder (together with Azlin) and thus sentenced Ridzuan to 27 years' jail and 24 strokes of the cane for voluntarily causing grievous hurt by dangerous means. Later on, Thuraisingam also help represent Ridzuan during the hearing of the prosecution's appeal, and he objected to the imposition of life imprisonment on Ridzuan on account of his young age and low functioning, which were factors that were in favour of leniency in his case. In the end, the five judges from the Court of Appeal increased Ridzuan's sentence to life imprisonment (with no caning) for the reduced charges (in light of the extreme cruelty of the abuse) while Azlin was found guilty of the original charge of murder and sentenced to life in prison by the same five judges.

=== Boh Soon Ho ===
Another one of the cases taken by Thuraisingam was the case of Boh Soon Ho, a Malaysian who was charged with murdering his Chinese girlfriend Zhang Huaxiang inside his rented room at Circuit Road. Thuraisingam argued that Boh should be convicted of culpable homicide not amounting to murder as he committed the killing under the loss of self control due to sudden and grave provocation caused by Zhang, who told Boh that she was seeing other men, which caused anger and hurt to Boh, who had one sided feelings for her and led to him using a towel to strangle Zhang to death. However, Boh's defence was rejected by the courts of Singapore, and he was found guilty of the original charge of murder. Despite Thuraisingam's failed efforts to reduce the charge, he successfully argued for Boh to evade the death penalty and he was instead sentenced to lifetime imprisonment on the grounds that he did not exhibit viciousness or blatant disregard for human life, and that the murder itself was not premeditated in the first place.

=== Tanah Merah ferry terminal killer ===
Thuraisingam also took charge of defending Ahmad Muin Yaacob, a Malaysian cleaner charged with murdering his supervisor Maimunah Awang (54 years old) at Tanah Merah Ferry Terminal and stealing her jewellery for money to cover his wedding expenses in November 2016. Although Thuraisingam was originally not Ahmad's lawyer at the start of his trial, he and his colleagues Chooi Jing Yen and Johannes Hadi took over the case by the time Ahmad was convicted of a Section 300(c) murder charge and awaiting his sentencing trial. Thuraisingam made representations to the prosecution that Ahmad had killed Maimunah in a fit of anger during a heated argument between him and Maimunah (who allegedly insulted Ahmad and his family), and there was no premeditation or intention on Ahmad's part to commit robbery and murder in the first place, and he argued that the case's overall nature and factors did not warrant the death penalty, which the prosecution eventually did not seek after relenting and agreeing to Thuraisingam's submissions. Ahmad was, in the end, sentenced to life imprisonment and 18 strokes of the cane on 4 November 2020.

=== Trial of Ahmed Salim ===
From September 2020 to December 2020, Thuraisingam and his firm associates Chooi Jing Yen and Hamza Malik represented a Bangladeshi painter on trial for killing his Indonesian girlfriend. The defendant, 31-year-old Ahmed Salim, committed the crime in December 2018 at a Geylang hotel due to the victim, 34-year-old domestic maid Nurhidayati Wartono Surata, wanting to break up with him in favour of another man, which prompted Ahmed to plan to murder the maid should she reject his final request to reconcile with him. Thuraisingam argued that Ahmed suffered from diminished responsibility because his adjustment disorder led to a substantial impairment of his mental faculties at the time of the offence, and even argued that he was provoked by Nurhidayati's alleged insults before the killing.

However, Ahmed's defences were rejected, and he was therefore convicted of murder under Section 300(a) of the Penal Code and sentenced to the mandatory death penalty in December 2020. Thuraisingam continued to represent Ahmed in his appeal, and argued for the reduction of his murder conviction, but the murder conviction and death sentence were both upheld by the Court of Appeal.

Ahmed Salim was executed by hanging in Changi Prison on the Wednesday morning of 28 February 2024.

=== Muhammad Salihin bin Ismail ===
Thuraisingam and his colleague Suang Wijaya were both the defence counsel of Muhammad Salihin bin Ismail, a Singaporean charged with the alleged murder of his four-year-old stepdaughter Nursabrina Agustiani Abdullah (nicknamed Sabrina) in September 2018. After taking the case, Thuraisingam argued that Salihin never had the intention to inflict the fatal abdominal injuries on Sabrina and never specifically aimed for the girl's stomach when he kicked the girl out of anger over the girl's failure to urinate in the toilet bowl despite having toilet-trained her multiple times. Through his efforts, Thuraisingam successfully persuaded the trial judge Pang Khang Chau to acquit Salihin of killing his stepdaughter, and in March 2022, the judge convicted Salihin of voluntarily causing grievous hurt, and he was sentenced to nine years' imprisonment with 12 strokes of the cane two months later. However, the acquittal was overturned upon the prosecution's appeal, and Salihin was therefore jailed for life with caning (12 strokes) after the Court of Appeal found him guilty of the original charge of murder on 2 April 2024.

== Anti-death penalty poem controversy ==
In 2017, Thuraisingam was brought to court by Lucien Wong, the Attorney-General, for allegedly scandalising the judiciary when he wrote a poem, titled Our Five Stars Dim Tonight, critical of the death penalty hours before the execution of drug trafficker Muhammad Ridzuan Md Ali, whom he had represented. Thuraisingam is said to have intended to bring home the point that the rich and powerful people in Singapore did not care about the unfairness of the mandatory death penalty for drug trafficking as most of the people facing the death penalty come from very poor backgrounds. Thuraisingam was fined S$6,000 by the court. Wong also lodged a complaint to the Law Society in relation to the same poem. A disciplinary tribunal appointed by Sundaresh Menon, the Chief Justice, held that Thuraisingam had not intended to attack the judiciary in his poem, which was found to be in contempt of court. They held that the references to judges in the poem 'is more likely to have been an authorial misstep than a deliberate assault upon judicial integrity'. Nevertheless, Thuraisingam was fined a further S$5,000 by the Law Society for penning the poem.

== Awards ==
In 2016, Thuraisingam received the Legal Assistance Scheme for Capital Offences award from Sundaresh Menon, the Chief Justice of Singapore, for his work in defending accused persons in death penalty cases.

In 2021, the Singapore Law Society Pro bono Ambassador award was presented to him by its president, Mr Gregory Vijayendran for his unstinting dedication to taking on pro bono cases for impecunious Singaporeans.
