= Jair (given name) =

Jair (alternatively spelt Jahir) is a masculine given name. It is derived from Hebrew יָאִיר (Yair), which means "he illuminates". It may refer to the following people:

- Jair (biblical figure) of Manasseh, biblical leader and homesteader
- Jair Bala (1943–2022), Brazilian footballer and manager
- Jair Baylón (born 1989), Peruvian footballer
- Jair Benítez (born 1979), Colombian footballer
- Jair Bernal (born 1968), Colombian road cyclist
- Jair Bolsonaro (born 1955), 38th president of Brazil
- Jair Renan Bolsonaro (born 1998), Brazilian politician
- Jair Braga (born 1954), Brazilian cyclist
- Jair Céspedes (born 1984), Peruvian footballer
- Jair Córdova (born 1996), Peruvian footballer
- Jair da Costa (1940–2025), Brazilian footballer
- Jair Eduardo Britto da Silva (born 1988), Brazilian footballer
- Jair García (born 1978), Mexican footballer
- Jair Gonçalves Prates (born 1953), Brazilian footballer
- Jair Jurrjens (born 1986), Curaçaoan baseball pitcher
- Jaïr Karam, French football player and manager
- Jair Lynch (born 1971), American gymnast
- Jair Marinho de Oliveira (born 1936), Brazilian footballer
- Jair Marrufo (born 1977), American association football referee
- Jair Nunes (born 1994), Santomean football player
- Jair Oliveira (born 1975), Brazilian composer, singer and producer
- Jair Pereira (born 1986), Portuguese-Mexican footballer
- Jair Pereira (football manager) (born 1946), Brazilian football manager and former player
- Jair Picerni (born 1944), Brazilian football manager and former player
- Jair Rosa (born 1975), Uruguayan footballer
- Jair da Rosa Pinto (1921–2005), Brazilian footballer
- Jair Reinoso (born 1985), Colombian footballer
- Jair Rodrigues (1939–2014), Brazilian musician and singer
- Jair Tavares da Silva (born 1994), Brazilian footballer
- Jair Ventura Filho (born 1944), also known as Jairzinho, Brazilian footballer
- Jair Yglesias (born 1981), Peruvian footballer

== See also ==
- Jair-Rôhm Parker Wells (born 1958), American improvisation bassist, composer and conceptualist
- Jahir, a given name and surname
- Yair (given name), a Jewish given name
