= Chao Hick Tin =

Singaporean lawyer and judge

Chao Hick Tin SC DUBC
- 赵锡燊

Judge of the Court of Appeal of Singapore
- In office 11 April 2008 – 27 September 2017
- Appointed by: S. R. Nathan

4th Attorney-General of Singapore
- In office 11 April 2006 – 10 April 2008
- Appointed by: S. R. Nathan
- Preceded by: Chan Sek Keong
- Succeeded by: Walter Woon

Judge of the Court of Appeal of Singapore
- In office 2 August 1999 – 11 April 2006
- Appointed by: Ong Teng Cheong

Judge of the Supreme Court of Singapore
- In office 15 November 1990 – 2 August 1999
- Appointed by: Wee Kim Wee

Judicial Commissioner of the Supreme Court of Singapore
- In office 1 October 1987 – 15 November 1990
- Appointed by: Wee Kim Wee

Personal details
- Born: 27 September 1942 (age 84) Singapore, Straits Settlements
- Education: University College London

Chao Hick Tin
- Simplified Chinese: 赵锡燊
Transcriptions
Standard Mandarin
- Hanyu Pinyin: Zhào Xíshēn

Chao Hick Tin SC DUBC (born 27 September 1942) is a Singaporean former judge who served as the fourth attorney-general of Singapore between 2006 and 2008.

== Early life ==
Chao was born in Singapore. He was educated at Catholic High School before graduating from the University College London with a Bachelor of Laws degree and a Master of Laws degree in 1965 and 1966 respectively.

== Judicial career ==
Chao was called to the Bar as a barrister of the Middle Temple in 1965. In 1967, he joined the Attorney-General's Chambers, Singapore where he rose to become a Senior State Counsel in 1979.

Chao was appointed the Head of the Civil Division in the Attorney-General's Chambers in 1982 and held that post until his elevation to the Supreme Court bench on 1 October 1987 as Judicial Commissioner. His elevation to the position of a Judge of the Supreme Court followed on 15 November 1990. On 2 August 1999, he was appointed a Judge of Appeal of the Supreme Court. On 11 April 2006 he stepped down from the court to become Attorney-General of Singapore. He ceased to be Attorney-General and was reappointed a Judge of Appeal every two years since 11 April 2008, and shortly thereafter was appointed vice-president of the Court of Appeal, until he retired the day before his 75th birthday on 27 September 2017.

On 5 Jan 2018, Chao was appointed senior judge of the Supreme Court for three years, followed by another two-year term commencing 5 January 2021.

Chao later stepped down as Senior Judge on 2 June 2022.

Throughout his tenure as a judge, Chao was known to be the judge presiding over several landmark cases, including the 2015 landmark ruling of Kho Jabing, a former death row inmate who was sentenced to life imprisonment and 24 strokes of the cane in a re-trial for the 2008 murder of construction worker Cao Ruyin, after the legal reforms allowed judges to have the power to sentence those convicted of murder with no intention to kill to life in prison or death. Chao and four other judges heard the case, and Chao was one of the three judges who, based on the majority decision, elected to sentence Kho to death a second time based on the brutality of the crime and blatant disregard for human life. This ruling also coined the main sentencing guidelines for murder under the new death penalty laws of Singapore. Kho was later executed on 20 May 2016.

== Other career ==
Chao is also one of the founding members of the ASEAN Law Association. He was also the first Commander of the Volunteer Special Constabulary, holding the rank of Assistant Commissioner of Police.

In 2019, Chao was appointed as the Chairman of the Singapore Chamber of Maritime Arbitration, a leading specialist arbitration institution that provides neutral, cost-effective, and flexible framework for the resolution of shipping and international trade arbitrations.

== Honours ==
In the National Day Awards of 2008, Chao was awarded the Darjah Utama Bakti Cemerlang (Distinguished Service Order) for his special contributions to the Pedra Branca dispute case.
