= Murder of Kwong Sau Lan =

1969 murder of a 17-year-old woman in Singapore

Kwong Sau Lan
- Kwong Sau Lan, pictured before her death
- Born: Kwong Sau Lan; 25 December 1951; Singapore
- Died: 21 June 1969 (aged 17); Bukit Merah, Singapore
- Cause of death: Murdered by stabbing
- Other name: Kong Sau Lan
- Known for: Murder victim

The murder of Kwong Sau Lan took place on 21 June 1969. Inside a flat at Bukit Merah, 17-year-old Kwong Sau Lan (Chinese: 江秀兰; Jyutping: Gong1 Sau3 Laan4) was stabbed to death by 19-year-old Chow Kim Hoong (Chinese: 周剑雄; Jyutping: Zau1 Gim3 Hung4), the brother of her fiancé. Similarly, Kwong's mother was also stabbed but survived her injuries. Chow was arrested three months later for the stabbing, and he was charged with killing Kwong and injuring her mother. It was revealed that due to a love triangle between the Chow brothers, Kwong and another woman, Chow had killed Kwong out of resentment.

After his arrest in September 1969, Chow was sentenced to death by the High Court in July 1970 for murder, but Chow successfully applied for a re-trial after the Court of Appeal allowed his appeal and overturned both his murder conviction and death sentence. However, in November 1971, Chow's death sentence was reinstated after the re-trial judges found him guilty of murder a second time. Later, Chow's appeals were dismissed, and he was hanged on 3 August 1973.

== Background ==
Born in Singapore on 25 December 1951, Kwong Sau Lan was the younger of two daughters in her family, and had an elder sister Kwong Chee Lan (Chinese: 江珠兰; Jyutping: Gong1 Zyu1 Laan4). Her father died in 1959, hence she lived together with her mother Lee Gan Yoke (Chinese: 李银玉; Jyutping: Lei5 Ngan4 Juk6; also spelt Lee Ghan Yoke or Lee Ghon Yoke) and sister.

Chow Kim Hoong, the younger of two sons, was born in Ipoh, Perak, Malaya (present-day Malaysia) in 1950, but he was stateless as of 1969 when he committed the murder of Kwong, although he still remained living in Singapore with his family. Chow worked various jobs, such as a hawker assistant, plumber and odd-job labourer, but he was jobless as of the time he committed the murder. During the Malaysian general elections period in 1969, Chow travelled to Kuala Lumpur to apply for Malaysian citizenship but his application was rejected because Chow failed his Malay language proficiency test.

Chow first got to know Kwong through his older brother Chow Kim Weng (Chinese: 周剑荣; Jyutping: Zau1 Gim3 Wing4; alias Ai Wah Chinese: 爱华; Jyutping: Oi3 Waa4), who first got to know Kwong in 1967, starting as each other's pen-pals, before they grew closer and became a couple, which led to Chow first knowing Kwong in February 1969 and later became friends with her.

On the night of Christmas of 1968, coincidentally the same day when Kwong celebrated her 17th birthday, she and Kim Weng first met Lily Pong Ah Moy (Chinese: 方亚妹; Bàng-uâ-cê: Bŭng Ă-muói), a bar hostess who became sworn siblings with Kwong and Kim Weng. As Pong and Kim Weng grew closer, they slowly formed intimate feelings for one another, which caused Kim Weng to become estranged from Kwong and they later broke up, which led to Kwong ending up with Chow. However, a few months after knowing Pong, Kim Weng found out that Pong was a married woman and had allegedly caused him to distance from Kwong due to lies and misunderstandings, which therefore made him stay away from Pong and reconcile with Kwong, and they became engaged and set to marry soon.

This love triangle would develop further and caused a rift in the relationship between Chow and both his brother and future sister-in-law, as this engagement led to Chow and Pong becoming a couple and both being united in their common resentment towards Kim Weng and Kwong. Chow often got into quarrels and physical confrontations with Kim Weng and Kwong, as a result of Pong spreading slanders and lies to Chow that Kwong had been mistreating her and even insulted him and his family.

One time in March 1969, Chow and a friend spent a few nights straight throwing rotten eggs and rocks at the Kwong family's house, out of revenge against Kwong for another allegation of her mistreatment of Pong. Chow and his friend was consequently arrested after a police report was lodged by the Kwongs, and reportedly, Chow stated he would not let Kwong and her kin off easily.

== Murder and charges ==
=== Stabbing ===
On 21 June 1969, Kwong Sau Lan, her sister Chee Lan, and their mother Lee Gan Yoke went to Chow Kim Hoong's flat at Bukit Merah (or Redhill), about three months after the egg-throwing incident. Inside the flat, Chow, who earlier argued with his father prior to the trio's arrival, confronted the trio and asked them why they had to mistreat Lily Pong, still believing in Pong's stories about Kwong, and Kwong denied that something like this happened.

As the confrontation and argument grew intense, Chow grabbed a knife from the shelf and used it to stab Kwong, with the prior intention of avenging himself for his earlier capture and hatred due to Pong's lies. Despite the fruitless attempts by Chow's mother and Kwong's mother to stop him, Chow managed to wound Kwong several times with the knife and even stabbed Kwong's mother twice. Kwong's sister managed to flee from the flat during the stabbing.

After he committed the stabbing, Chow left his flat and soon, he escaped from Singapore to the neighbouring country of Malaysia. Simultaneously, in the aftermath of the stabbing, both Kwong and her mother were rushed to Outram Hospital. However, 17-year-old Kwong Sau Lan died while receiving treatment, and only Kwong's 45-year-old mother Lee Gan Yoke survived her wounds and later recovered. According to Professor Chao Tzee Cheng, the forensic pathologist who examined Kwong's corpse, one of the knife wounds on Kwong's chest penetrated the lung, which was fatal and therefore led to the death of Kwong.

=== Arrest ===
The police were later contacted, and they investigated the case as murder, and put up a warrant of arrest for Chow Kim Hoong's capture after establishing his identity. Three months later, on 8 September 1969, Chow was arrested by the Royal Malaysia Police at Johor Bahru, Malaysia. He was extradited back to Singapore four days later, and charged with one count of murder and one count of voluntarily causing grievous hurt on 12 September 1969.

Back then, under Section 302 of the Penal Code, the death penalty was mandated as the sole punishment for all murder offences in Singapore, hence for the most serious charge of murder, Chow faced the possibility of execution if found guilty. Since Chow was 19 years old at the time he committed the offence of murder, he was eligible for the death penalty since offenders aged 18 and above would receive a death sentence for capital crimes like murder.

== Chow's murder trial ==
=== Testimony and defence ===
Chow Kim Hoong
- 1969 police mugshot of Chow Kim Hoong
- Born: Chow Kim Hoong; 1950; Ipoh, Perak, Malaysia
- Died: 3 August 1973 (aged 22–23); Changi Prison, Singapore
- Cause of death: Execution by hanging
- Occupations: Hawker assistant (former); Plumber (former); Odd-job labourer (former)
- Status: Executed
- Conviction: Murder (one count)
- Criminal charges: 1st: Murder of Kwong Sau Lan; 2nd: Voluntarily causing hurt to Lee Gan Yoke
- Penalty: Death penalty

After some pre-trial conferences (which ended on 20 December 1969), Chow Kim Hoong stood trial on 14 July 1970 for two charges, one for murder with respect to Kwong Sau Lan's killing and another for voluntarily causing grievous hurt with respect to the stabbing of Kwong's mother. C. Paramjothy represented Chow in his trial while the trial prosecutor was Isaac Paul Ratnam, and the trial was presided by both judges T Kulasekaram and Tan Ah Tah.

Kwong's sister Chee Lan, who was then pregnant with a child, came to court as a witness to testify about what she witnessed and the knife attack on her sister and mother. Inspector Ling Duing Kwong, who investigated the stabbing case, testified that during the final moments of her life, Kwong had said in her dying breath that it was Chow who stabbed her. In the face of prosecutorial evidence, Chow denied that he intentionally killed her, and claimed that he was gravely provoked into using a knife to stab Kwong during a heated argument, in which Kwong had allegedly insulted him. He also stated he never realized he had grabbed onto the knife until the point he stabbed Kwong, and claimed it was Lee who ran into the knife and accidentally injured herself.

=== Verdict ===
On 18 July 1970, the two trial judges - Justice T Kulasekaram and Justice Tan Ah Tah - delivered their verdict. Justice Tan, who pronounced the verdict, stated that there was no doubt that Chow had intentionally knifed Kwong several times with the view of causing bodily injury to Kwong, such that the injuries were sufficient in the ordinary course of nature to cause death, and therefore rejected his defence of having no intention to kill and abnormality of the mind. They additionally found that Chow had intended to cause hurt to Kwong's mother Lee Gan Yoke, in contrast to his claim that Lee had accidentally run into the knife he was holding in his hand.

Therefore, 20-year-old Chow Kim Hoong was found guilty of the murder of Kwong Sau Lan and voluntarily causing hurt to Lee Gan Yoke. For the most serious charge of murder, Chow was sentenced to death by hanging, while he also received a one-year prison sentence for the other charge of causing hurt, which could also warrant the maximum of three years' imprisonment if convicted.

== Chow's re-trial for murder ==
=== Appeal for re-trial ===
Chow's appeal was heard a year after he was convicted and sentenced. Chow's lawyer John Tan Chor Yong argued that Chow should not be tried in the same trial for both the capital charge of murder and non-capital charge of voluntarily causing hurt, as the two-judge panel of the trial court was constituted to hear only the capital cases where it warranted the imposition of capital punishment, while non-capital cases, where the death penalty was not imposed, were only entitled for trial hearing by a single judge.

On 7 July 1971, the Court of Appeal allowed the appeal, and after revoking Chow's death sentence and conviction, the three appellate judges - Choor Singh, F A Chua and Chief Justice Wee Chong Jin - ordered that a re-trial, with respect to the most serious charge of murder, should be conducted, and in any cases concerning both capital and non-capital charges, separate trials should be carried out in view of the different number of judges allowed to hear these cases, with the priority placed upon capital case trials.

=== Re-trial proceedings ===
On 25 October 1971, the re-trial of Chow Kim Hoong for the sole charge of murder began at the High Court, with John Tan continuing to represent Chow. The trial prosecutor was replaced by P O Ram, and the case was heard before a new two-judge panel, consisting of veteran judges A V Winslow and D C D'Cotta. The second charge for knifing and injuring Lee Gan Yoke was temporarily stood down during the re-trial proceedings for Kwong's murder.

While the witnesses of the trial (including Kwong's sister and mother) and testimonies regarding the stabbing largely remained the same, Chow put up a defence of diminished responsibility. He additionally stated that he was gravely provoked into killing Kwong and never meant to cause her death, and he intended to grab a cup to hit Kwong but laid his hands on the wrong object - a knife - before the stabbing. With regards to the alleged abnormality of the mind, Chow explained that due to his unhappy childhood, the parental negligence and his inability to find a stable job due to his statelessness, he had depression and frequent bouts of emotional instability and even inherited chronic headaches from his father. According to defence psychiatrist Yap Meow Foo, who testified on Chow's behalf, these emotional instabilities, in addition to major depressive disorder, led to Chow being prone to sharp, explosive reactions to any insult directed at him or his family member.

=== Re-trial verdict ===
On 20 November 1971, after the end of the re-trial, which lasted twenty days, the two re-trial judges - Justice A V Winslow and Justice D C D'Cotta - delivered the re-trial verdict.

Justice Winslow, who pronounced the verdict, stated that based on the evidence, it was crystal-clear that Chow had indeed intentionally stabbed 17-year-old Kwong Sau Lan with the view to cause her death or inflict injuries sufficient to result in death. The judges also rejected the defence's psychiatric opinion, and instead accept the prosecution's psychiatric evidence that Chow was mentally sound and did not suffer from diminished responsibility at the time of the offence of murder, and was fully aware of the magnitude of his actions. In conclusion, they found Chow guilty of the original charge of murder a second time, and re-imposed the death penalty on 21-year-old Chow Kim Hoong, who was emotionless but speechless at the re-trial's verdict of death.

== Execution ==
After the end of his re-trial, Chow Kim Hoong appealed his death sentence and conviction a second time. This time round however, the Court of Appeal dismissed Chow's appeal on 23 January 1973, after they found that Chow's defences of sudden and grave provocation and diminished responsibility could not be applied since circumstances had directed the court to the conclusion that Chow had intentionally stabbed Kwong with the view to cause her death, which amounted to an offence of murder.

As of February 1973, the month after Chow lost his appeal, he was one of the eleven inmates on death row awaiting their executions, among them included Mimi Wong, Sim Woh Kum, the seven Gold Bar killers and a gardener Osman bin Ali, all were convicted of murder like Chow.

Subsequently, Chow's application for leave to appeal to the Privy Council in London was dismissed on 20 June 1973, and his clemency petition was also rejected by then President of Singapore Benjamin Sheares in July 1973.

On 3 August 1973, Chow Kim Hoong was hanged at Changi Prison. Chow was 22 years old at the time when he was put to death. Chow was the fourth person to be executed within the week itself, after the executions of bar hostess Mimi Wong and her sweeper husband Sim Woh Kum for killing a Japanese woman, as well as the hanging of gardener Osman bin Ali for killing both a cook and an amah; all three were hanged on the same morning of 27 July 1973 for their respective offences.

As of October 1973, two months after Chow was hanged, thirteen prisoners, eight for murder and five for kidnapping, remained on death row pending their executions.

== See also ==
- Capital punishment in Singapore
