= Leedon Park double murders =

1970 double murder case in Singapore

- Osman bin Ali, the Leedon Park double killer
- Date: 1 November 1970
- Location: Leedon Park, Singapore
- Outcome: Osman arrested a day after the murders and charged in 1970; Osman was found guilty of murder and sentenced to death in 1971; Osman was executed by hanging at Changi Prison in 1973
- Deaths: Tan Tai Hin (68); Wu Tee (58)
- Injuries: None
- Convicted: Osman bin Ali (31)
- Verdict: Guilty
- Convictions: Murder (Two counts)
- Sentence: Death penalty

On 1 November 1970, 31-year-old gardener Osman bin Ali murdered a 68-year-old cook Tan Tai Hin (Chinese: 陈在贤; Bǽh-oe-tu: Dân Tāi-hiân) and 58-year-old amah Wu Tee (Chinese: 伍娣; pinyin: Wú Dì) inside their employer's bungalow house at Leedon Park, Singapore. Osman, who also worked for the owner of the bungalow, was arrested and charged with two counts of murder the next day, when the bodies were discovered.

Through his lawyer David Saul Marshall, Osman argued that the killings were not intentional and put up a defence of diminished responsibility, citing his low IQ of 89 to show that he could not be held fully responsible for the two murders. However, the trial court found that Osman was mentally normal and fully understood the magnitude of his actions, and hence found him guilty of the two murders and sentenced him to death. After failing his appeals against the sentence, Osman's execution was finalized and carried out on 27 July 1973.

== Double murders ==
On the morning of 2 November 1970, at a bungalow house at Leedon Park, 14-year-old schoolgirl Low Ek Meng was the first to discover her mother being murdered. Low heard some sounds of water from the bathroom, which led her to the place, where she found her 58-year-old mother Wu Tee's body inside the longbath of the main bathroom. Wu, who was a Hainanese-born Singaporean, was working as an amah for the bungalow's owner C P Thomas, who was absent from his home and on holiday with his whole family at the time of the murder. Her job was mainly to help wash the dishes for the family.

Soon after, a second grisly discovery was made inside the servant's quarters of the bungalow. A neighbour's gardener, who came to the aid of Low, discovered the body of an elderly man, who was hanged by his neck by the window beam of the quarters. The man was 68-year-old Tan Tai Hin, who worked as a cook for the family. Like Wu, Tan was also a Hainanese immigrant. A suspect was arrested at Bukit Merah police station on the same day, less than an hour after the bodies were discovered. The male suspect was noted to be drunk and later referred to Outram Hospital for treatment.

Both victims were found with strangulation marks around their necks, and according to the forensic pathologist Chao Tzee Cheng, who performed an autopsy on the bodies, he certified that the deaths were the result of strangulation with the use of a rope, and with great force applied. Chao stated that Tan did not die from the hanging but died due to strangulation, because the internal damage and tissue surrounding the strangulation mark on Tan's neck was far more severe than those of hanging.

The suspect arrested for the double killings was charged on 3 November 1970 with two counts of murder. The suspect was 31-year-old Osman bin Ali, a gardener who worked for the bungalow's owner, and was a colleague of the two victims Tan Tai Hin and Wu Tee. Subsequently, Osman was remanded for investigations of the murders and to undergo psychiatric assessment. Prior to the murders, Osman was said to share a good relationship with both his alleged victims Tan and Wu, and had worked for the household for ten years.

Since the charges of murder came under Section 302 of the Penal Code, which mandated the death penalty as the sole punishment for murder offences in Singapore, Osman would be executed for the double killings if found guilty of murder under Singapore law.

== Trial of Osman bin Ali ==
=== Osman's background ===
Originally from Indonesia, Osman bin Ali lost his father at age two and therefore, Osman and his mother immigrated to Singapore, where she remarried and had more children with her second husband. Osman was sent to live with a relative due to not enough accommodation for a large number of the children. Osman went to primary school at age seven but dropped out after two months, as a result of a speech defect. After which, Osman underwent treatment for his speech problems, which later improved, although he never resumed his studies. Osman later worked as a gardener at age 15, and eventually began working as the gardener for the Thomas family at their Leedon Park bungalow, a job which lasted ten years before he committed the double murder.

=== Prosecution's case ===
On 14 September 1971, after a five-day preliminary hearing in February of the same year, 32-year-old Osman bin Ali officially stood trial at the High Court for two charges of murdering Wu Tee and Tan Tai Hin. Prominent lawyer and opposition politician David Saul Marshall represented Osman in his trial while Isaac Paul Ratnam was the trial prosecutor. The case was heard by two judges Choor Singh and D C D'Cotta.

The pathologist Chao Tzee Cheng came to court to present his autopsy findings to the court. He testified that based on the manner of how the victims were killed, it was likely that the killer had caught both Tan and Wu by surprise from behind and strangled them, considering that there were no signs of a struggle and judging from the duration of the strangulation, the death of the victims occurred within a minute. Wu's daughter Low Ek Meng came to court to testify that before the double murders of her mother and Tan, she last seen her mother going to wash the clothes and even had a friendly conversation with Osman, and last saw Tan returning from the market before proceeding to wash his clothes. After this, she heard Tan saying "apa macham" in a frightened tone, and this led to her coming outside and discovering her mother's body. Osman's cousin Naim bin Ali also told the court that shortly after the murders, Osman had gone to his house to tell him he killed two people due to a misunderstanding before he drunk some wine and went to the police station.

=== Defence's case ===
Osman later elected to give his evidence, and he denied that he had intentionally used the rope to strangle the victims. His main defence was diminished responsibility. Osman told the court that he suffered from head injuries due to a traffic accident ten years ago, and hence he became easily prone to anger and fought with his sisters and step-brothers. Osman testified that on the day of the murders, he had an argument with Wu and it caused him to, in a fit of anger, use a rope to assault and strangle Wu, and later, he attacked Tan, who happened to chance upon the killing and he therefore strangled Tan, and subsequently hung his body to give the impression that Tan had committed suicide by hanging. Osman added that after the killings, he was plagued with nightmares of his victims.

David Marshall argued that based on psychiatric opinion by defence psychiatrist Wong Yip Chong, Osman had a low IQ of 89, and with subnormal intelligence and mental defects, Osman was prone to extreme and impulsive reactions even in the face of the most minor of provocations, leading to him reacting abnormally and impulsively at the time of the killings. Marshall sought to argue that these above factors, be it mental or environmental, had been sufficient to prove that Osman was suffering from an abnormality of the mind and therefore, he should not be guilty of murder but of manslaughter.

However, Dr F Y Long, the prosecution's psychiatric expert, testified that despite his low IQ, Osman was observed to be spontaneous, relevant, clear of speech, rational and co-operative. Dr Long said that Osman was also able to have normal social interactions, and cognitive functioning, persistently tried to solve his problems, and had no problems with daily functioning. This showed that Osman was not suffering from impaired mental responsibility at the time of the offences, and had full awareness of the magnitude of his actions, corroborating the prosecution's contention that Osman had intentionally committed the murders with the premeditation to kill both Tan and Wu, without the need to prove any motive behind the killings.

=== Verdict ===
On 28 September 1971, the trial judges Choor Singh and D C D'Cotta delivered their verdict. In the judgement, Justice Singh, who pronounced the verdict, stated that the prosecution had proven its case beyond a reasonable doubt, accepting the evidence that Osman was not suffering from any abnormality of the mind when he killed both Tan Tai Hin and Wu Tee, and hence, they found 32-year-old Osman bin Ali guilty of committing the premeditated murders of Tan and Wu, and sentenced him to death for two counts of murder.

Reportedly, Osman's 48-year-old mother Che Maria binte Supri, who had been fasting and praying for her son, was so distraught at the death sentence that she actually fainted, and had to be brought out and laid on a bench until she regained consciousness. Osman's mother, one of his younger brothers Salim and one of Osman's sisters wept at the verdict.

== Appeal ==
After he was sentenced to death, Osman filed an appeal to the Court of Appeal against his conviction and sentence in August 1972. David Marshall, who continued to represent Osman in the appeal, argued that the trial judges had erred in rejecting his client's diminished responsibility defence, stating that the psychiatric evidence which were in favour of Osman had not been given due consideration, since his killings were likely the product of a mind's impulsive reaction rather than intentional murder.

However, on 11 September 1972, the three judges - Supreme Court judges Tan Ah Tah and F A Chua, and Chief Justice Wee Chong Jin - found that there were sufficient evidence to demonstrate that Osman indeed never suffered from diminished responsibility at the time of the murders, and therefore dismissed the appeal on the basis that Osman had indeed committed the murders with the intention and premeditation to cause death.

In February 1973, Osman was revealed to be one of the eleven inmates on death row awaiting their executions, among them included Mimi Wong, Sim Woh Kum, the seven Gold Bar killers, and labourer Chow Kim Hoong, and they were all convicted of murder.

Subsequently, Osman applied for special leave to appeal to the Privy Council, but on 3 April 1973, it was reported that Osman's plea had been rejected by the Privy Council.

== Execution ==
On 27 July 1973, 34-year-old Osman bin Ali was hanged in Changi Prison at dawn. On the same morning, bar hostess Mimi Wong and her sweeper husband Sim Woh Kum were both executed for the sensational murder of a Japanese woman, who was the wife of Wong's Japanese boyfriend.

Osman's family were informed of Osman's execution date through his death warrant four days earlier, and over a hundred of his relatives and friends gathered outside the prison to retrieve his remains. After Osman's body was returned to his family, he was buried at Bidadari Cemetery after a funeral on the same day. An imam also counselled Osman while he was on death row.

== See also ==
- Capital punishment in Singapore
