= Murder of Karuppan Velusamy =

1973 murder of a one-armed man in Singapore

Karuppan Velusamy
- Born: Karuppan Velusamy c. 1921; India
- Died: 1 February 1973 (aged 52); Jalan Berseh, Jalan Besar, Singapore
- Cause of death: Fatal head injuries
- Other names: Karoppan Velasamy; Kurubbun Velusamy
- Occupation: Unemployed
- Known for: Murder victim

On 1 February 1973, 52-year-old Karuppan Velusamy, a one-armed jobless man, was brutally murdered while sleeping on a five-foot way street in Jalan Berseh, off Jalan Besar in Singapore. Velusamy's killer was arrested a week after his death, when 26-year-old labourer Ismail bin U. K. Abdul Rahman was caught as a suspect. Ismail, who earlier confessed to committing the murder due to a misunderstanding between him and the victim, denied in court that he was the perpetrator and claimed an alibi, stating he was sleeping at his girlfriend's home at the time of the offence. After some deliberation, the High Court found Ismail guilty of murdering Velusamy and sentenced him to death, after rejecting his alibi defence and accepting both his confession and the evidence of two men who saw or heard Ismail killing Velusamy. In the aftermath, Ismail's appeals were dismissed, and he was hanged on 28 February 1975.

== Murder investigation ==
On the morning of 1 February 1973, an elderly one-armed man was found dead at a PUB quarters in Jalan Berseh, off Jalan Besar in Singapore.

The deceased man, identified as 52-year-old Karuppan Velusamy, was first discovered at a five-foot way with several open wounds on his body, either caused by slashing or stabbing, and a bloodstain shaped like a palm print was discovered nearby. Residents living nearby reportedly heard a commotion from the ground floor of the quarters at around 4 am, and Velusamy's death was first reported five hours after the supposed commotion, which was likely an attack on Velusamy's life. Velusamy's death was believed to be caused by a group of men armed with deadly weapons, based on speculations and theories that the police considered during investigations. Velusamy, whose wife and son were living in India, was jobless for many years and he spent at least ten years on social welfare financial schemes, living with his relatives in Singapore. Velusamy was revealed to have lost his right arm due to a bombing during World War II. His relative Adimoolam Vadivelu also told the press that Velusamy was good to people around him and he never held any grudges.

Professor Chao Tzee Cheng, a senior forensic pathologist, conducted a post-mortem examination on Velusamy, and based on his autopsy findings, Professor Chao found that Velusamy sustained traumatic head injuries, and two major fractures (measured 4 cm and 6 cm respectively) were located on the lower side of his skull; another two skull fractures were inflicted below his right eye, and these injuries were sufficient in the ordinary course of nature to cause death.

On 8 February 1973, a week after Velusamy was murdered, it was reported that the police arrested a suspect behind the murder at Serangoon Road, and he was held in remand pending further investigations by the police. On that same day, another man was also apprehended for a separate murder case that had no relation to the Velusamy case.

== Ismail's murder trial ==
On 8 October 1973, the suspect, identified as 26-year-old Ismail bin U. K. Abdul Rahman, was officially brought to trial at the High Court for murdering Karuppan Velusamy. G. Gopalan represented Ismail during the trial while the prosecution was led by Alan Wong, and the trial was presided over by two veteran judges: Justice Frederick Arthur Chua (F A Chua) and Justice Tan Ah Tah.

The trial court was told that a past misunderstanding occurred between Ismail and Velusamy, whom Ismail accidentally banged into before it escalated into an argument between the two men. Due to the past dispute, Ismail attacked Velusamy and fatally assaulted him. In fact, in a statement dated 17 February 1973, which was written after he was arrested and charged for Velusamy's murder, Ismail had admitted to using a changkol to hack Velusamy three times on his head, battering him to death. One of the prosecution's witnesses was Muthu Kamaru, who was sleeping nearby Velusamy at the time of the attack, and he witnessed Ismail attacking and assaulting Velusamy with a changkol, and Muthu alleged that Ismail threatened him in Tamil, asking if he wanted to meet the same fate as Velusamy. Another key witness for the prosecution was Mohammed Micha, who testified that on the day of the murder, after the crime was committed, Ismail had admitted to him that he had beaten Velusamy and caused his death.

On 12 October 1973, Ismail elected to put up his defence after the close of the prosecution's case. In his defence, Ismail claimed that he was sleeping at his girlfriend's home at Sam Leong Road, and he was never at the scene of crime, and he only read about the crime on the paper a day after it happened. Ismail also claimed his confession to Inspector Michael Won was not given voluntarily and the police investigator had threatened him to confess. The defence also tried to raise doubts over the validity of the testimonies given by the two key prosecution witnesses.

On 15 October 1973, Justice Tan Ah Tah and Justice F A Chua delivered their verdict, with Justice Chua pronouncing the sentence in court. In the joint judgement, which was made 90 minutes after closing submissions, Justice Chua stated that they rejected Ismail's alibi defence and opted to accept that Ismail killed Velusamy since he confessed to committing the murder in his cautioned statement, and there were also witnesses who knew about his involvement in the crime, one having witnessed Ismail at the scene of crime while the other heard Ismail say that he killed Velusamy. Justice Chua also said that the judges were inclined to accept the prosecution's arguments that Ismail had mercilessly battered Velusamy to death and believed that Ismail's statement was truthful and voluntarily made. They thus ruled that Ismail should be held fully culpable for the merciless slaying of Velusamy on 1 February 1973.

Ismail was found guilty of murder and sentenced to death by hanging. Prior to 2013, the death penalty was classified as the mandatory sentence for all four degrees of murder under the Singaporean Penal Code.

As of February 1974, Ismail was one of 17 people held on death row in Changi Prison, and the number dropped to 15 by October 1974, with Ismail and the remaining 14 people convicted of murder still awaiting their executions.

== Appeal process ==
While he was incarcerated on death row at Changi Prison, Ismail appealed to the Court of Appeal. His defence counsel R Murugason argued that there was barely any evidence against Ismail to prove the murder charge except for his cautioned statement in which he admitted to murdering Velusamy, and also raised a defence of alcohol intoxication. On 25 April 1974, the Court of Appeal dismissed Ismail's appeal and upheld both his murder conviction and death sentence. The three appellate judges - Chief Justice Wee Chong Jin and two Supreme Court judges Choor Singh and A V Winslow - rejected the defence's arguments and they also cited that apart from Ismail's statement that he was drunk, the defence did not bring forward any evidence to substantiate the claim.

After losing his appeal, Ismail filed a motion for special leave to appeal to the Privy Council in London for a review of his case, and Queen's Counsel Dingle Foot argued on behalf of Ismail that his statements should not have been admitted. He raised doubts over the validity of the two prosecution witnesses who claimed to hear or see Ismail killing Velusamy. However, on 5 December 1974, Ismail's application was rejected by the Privy Council, which dismissed the defence's case.

As a final recourse to escape the gallows, Ismail petitioned to the President of Singapore for clemency, with hopes to commute his death sentence to life in prison. However, then-President Benjamin Sheares rejected his final death row plea for clemency, and confirmed the death penalty sentence.

== Execution ==
On Friday morning, 28 February 1975, 28-year-old Ismail bin U. K. Abdul Rahman was hanged in Changi Prison. Ismail was one of the eight criminals to be executed that morning; the remaining seven convicts were a pair of brothers, Andrew Chou and David Chou, and another five youngsters who were all found guilty of murdering three gold smugglers to rob them of 120 gold bars in 1971. The case, known as the Gold Bars triple murders, was committed by the seven condemned and three other accomplices, two of whom were minors and thus imprisoned at the President's Pleasure rather than facing execution; a third man turned state evidence against the nine others and was detained indefinitely without trial under the Criminal Law (Temporary Provisions) Act.

Reportedly, over 200 friends and relatives, consisting of those of Ismail and the seven Gold Bar killers, gathered outside the jail to reclaim the bodies of the eight men, who were all put to death within 20 minutes; the first six of the eight men were hanged in batches of three before the remaining two were executed altogether. The State Coroner, several doctors and prison officers were present at the gallows when the eight men's death sentences were carried out.

== See also ==
- Capital punishment in Singapore
