= Ashok =

Ashok is a given name.

It may refer to:

== Actors ==
- Ashok Kumar (Tamil actor) (born 1981), South Indian actor and Bharatnatyam performer
- Ashok Kumar (1911–2001), Indian film actor
- Ashok Lokhande (born 1950), Indian film actor
- Ashok Mehta (1947–2012), Indian film actor
- Ashok Saraf (born 1947), Indian actor and comedian, Marathi and Hindi
- Ashok Selvan (born 1989), Indian actor
- Ashok Shinde, Indian film actor
- Ashok (Kannada actor) (born 1951), Kannada film actor

== Chief Ministers of Indian states ==
- Ashok Chavan (born 1958), Chief Minister of Maharashtra
- Ashok Gehlot (born 1951), chief minister of the Indian state of Rajasthan
- R. Ashok, former Deputy Chief Minister of Indian State of Karnataka

== Cricketers ==
- Ashok Upadhyay (born 1953), Indian cricketer
- Asoka de Silva (cricketer) (born 1956), Sri Lankan Sinhala cricketer

== Film-related ==
- Ashok Amritraj (born 1956), Indian American film producer
- Ashok Gaikwad (born 1962), Indian film director
- Ashok, a fictional character portrayed by Danny Denzongpa in his 1980 Indian film Phir Wohi Raat

== Law and enforcement ==
- Ashok Chaturvedi (born 1947), former chief of India's external intelligence agency
- Ashok Desai, Attorney General of India, 1996 to 1998
- Asoka de Silva (judge) (born 1946), Sri Lankan Sinhala judge, Chief Justice
- Ashok B. Hinchigeri, Indian judge
- Ashok Kamte (1965–2008), Additional Commissioner of Mumbai Police for the East Region

== Literature ==
- Ashok Banker (born 1964), Indian novelist and short story writer
- Ashokamitran (1931–2017), influential figure in post-independent Tamil literature

== Others ==
- Ashok Banerjee, Indian academic
- A. H. Asoka de Silva, Sri Lanka Navy officer
- Ashok Captain (born 1960), Indian herpetologist
- Ashok Row Kavi (born 1947), Indian journalist and LGBT rights activist
- Ashok Raosaheb Pawar, Indian politician
- Ashok (powerlifter)

== See also ==
- Ashok (film), a 2006 Telugu film directed by Surender Reddy
- Ashok Leyland, an Indian commercial vehicle manufacturer founded in 1948 based in Chennai
- Ashoknagar (disambiguation) or Ashok Nagar, the name of various places in India
- Ashok Vihar, neighborhood of North West Delhi, Delhi, India
  - Ashok Vihar metro station, Delhi Metro
- Asok (disambiguation)
- Ashoka (disambiguation)
