= Ashoka (disambiguation) =

Ashoka (died 232 BC) was a monarch of the Mauryan Empire of India.

Ashoka or Asoka may also refer to:

== Entertainment ==
- Ashoka (2006 film), a 2006 Kannada film directed by Shivamani
- Ashoka (2008 film), a 2008 Tamil film directed by Prem
- Asoka (1955 film), a 1955 Sri Lankan film directed by Sirisena Wimalaweera
- Aśoka (film), a 2001 Bollywood historical drama film directed by Santosh Sivan
- Ashoka the Great (book), a 2011 book by Wytze Keuning
- Ashoka the Hero, a 2011 Indian animated film

== People ==
- Ashoka (Gonandiya), a king of Kashmir

== Other uses ==
- Ashoka (non-profit organization), an international citizen sector organization
- Emperor Ashoka, the aircraft in the 1978 Air India Flight 855 crash

== See also ==
- Ashok, a given name
- Ashoka tree (disambiguation)
- Ashokan (disambiguation)
- Asoka de Silva (disambiguation)
- Ahsoka (disambiguation)
