= Asok =

Asok may refer to:

- Asok (Dilbert), a character in the Dilbert comic strip
- Asok or Asoke, short name for Asok Montri Road (Thai: ถนนอโศกมนตรี) or Sukhumvit Soi 21 in Bangkok
  - Asok BTS Station, a BTS skytrain station located on the intersection where Asok Montri meats Sukhumvit Road
  - Asok railway halt, an SRT Eastern Line station
- Ašok Murti (born 1962), Serbian wardrobe stylist
- Asok Kumar Ganguly, Indian judge and former chairman of the West Bengal Human Rights Commission
- Asok Kumar Barua, Indian condensed matter physicist

== See also ==
- Ashok, a given name
