= Ashokan =

Ashokan or Asokan may refer to:

- Something related to Ashoka (304–232 BCE), Indian emperor of the Mauryan Empire

== Places ==
- Ashokan Center, a Catskills outdoor education center and retreat facility
- Ashokan Reservoir, part of the New York City watershed

== People ==
=== Ashokan ===
- Ashokan (actor) (born 1961), actor in Malayalam cinema
- Ashokan (film director) (1961–2022), director in Malayalam cinema
- Gayathri Ashokan (born 1957), poster designer for Malayalam films
- Harisree Ashokan (born 1964), actor in Malayalam cinema
- S. A. Ashokan (1931–1982), actor in Tamil cinema

=== Asokan ===
- Thaha or Asokan, Indian film director and writer
- Asokan K. M., involved in the 2017–2018 Indian Supreme Court Hadiya case
- Asokan Charuvil, Indian writer
- S. A. Ashokan (1931–1982), Indian actor
- S. S. Asokan, Singaporean convicted murderer

=== Asogan ===
- Asogan Ramesh Ramachandren, Singaporean convicted murderer

== Other uses ==
- Ashokan Edicts in Delhi, edicts of the Indian emperor
- Ashoka Chakra or Ashokan Chakra, a symbol on the Indian flag
- Ashokan Prakrit, Indic language of the Prakrit class during the period of emperor Ashoka
- Pillars of Ashoka or Ashokan Pillars, series of monolithic columns erected by the Indian emperor
- "Ashokan Farewell", a song
- Yoddha (1992 film) or Ashokan, a 1992 Indian film by Sangeeth Sivan

== See also ==
- Ashoka (disambiguation)
