= Ahsoka =

Ahsoka may refer to:

- Ahsoka Tano, a fictional Star Wars character
  - Ahsoka (novel), a 2016 novel
  - Star Wars: Ahsoka, a 2023 live-action television series

== See also ==
- Ashoka (disambiguation)
