= Ašok Murti =

Serbian wardrobe stylist (1962)

Ašok Murti Ашок Мурти
- Born: June 2, 1962 (age 63); Šabac, Yugoslavia (now Serbia)
- Occupation: wardrobe stylist
- Years active: 1994–present

Ašok Murti (Serbian Cyrillic: Ашок Мурти; born 1962) is a Serbian wardrobe stylist, considered to be the country's most famous wardrobe stylist.

== Biography ==
Murti began to draw at a very young age, which was soon recognized by his grandfather and his teachers in school. His teachers decided to register him at a special school for talents in Šabac, where he finished primary and secondary school.

After serving in the Yugoslav army he came to the capital city Belgrade, without an idea that he would stay to live there. Murti's mother is Serbian, while his father is Indian. He identifies as Yugoslav. His parents were friends of former Prime Minister of India Indira Gandhi.

He later studied architecture and actually worked as an architect until 1994. Between 1994 and 2001 he worked as a wardrobe stylist for BK Television. After that he worked for RTV Pink between 2001 and 2007. Today, he is a freelancer.
