= Ashok Banerjee =

Indian academic

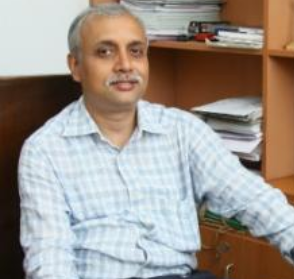
- Born: India
- Scientific career
- Fields: Finance
- Institutions: Indian Institute of Management Udaipur

Ashok Banerjee (born 23 July 1965) is an Indian academic and administrator who serves as the Director of Indian Institute of Management Udaipur (IIM Udaipur), a position he has held since August 2022. Prior to this appointment, he was a Senior Professor of Finance and the Dean of New Initiatives at Indian Institute of Management Calcutta (IIM Calcutta), where he was instrumental in establishing the institution's Financial Research and Trading Laboratory. Banerjee's academic research and corporate consultancy focus primarily on corporate governance, financial derivatives, and market microstructure.

== Education ==
Banerjee holds an M.Com. degree from Calcutta University and a Ph.D. from Rajasthan University. At IIM Calcutta, he is a senior Professor in the Finance and Control group, and takes several advanced courses in Finance like Financial Accountancy, Corporate Finance, Corporate Restructuring and Behavioural Finance. He is also the faculty in-charge of the Finance Research and Trading Lab at IIM-C.

Banerjee's primary research interests are in areas of Financial Time Series and Operational Risk Management.

== Selected bibliography ==
- Banerjee A: Financial Accounting: A Managerial Emphasis (ISBN 978-8174464156)
- Banerjee A: Real Option Valuation of a Pharmaceutical Company, Vikalpa (2003, Vol 28, No. 2, April–June 2003, pages 61–73).
- Banerjee A & Bhattacharyya, M: Integration of Global Capital Markets: An Empirical Exploration, International Journal of Theoretical and Applied Finance (2004, VOL 7; PART 4, pages 385–406).
- Banerjee A, Chakrabarti B B & Deb S: Value Premium in Indian Equity Market: an Empirical Evidence, ICFAI Journal of Applied Finance (December 2006, Vol. 12, No. 12, pages 41–60).
