= Mimi Wong =

Convicted murderer and first woman executed in Singapore

Mimi Wong Weng Siu
- Born: c. 1939; Singapore, Straits Settlements
- Died: 27 July 1973 (aged 34); Changi Prison, Singapore
- Cause of death: Execution by hanging
- Other names: Mimi Wong (stage name); Wong Weng Siu (birth name)
- Status: Executed
- Conviction: Murder (1 count)
- Penalty: Death sentence
- Accomplice: Sim Woh Kum - Ex-husband (executed on 27 July 1973)

Details
- Victims: 1
- Date: 6 January 1970
- Country: Singapore
- Date apprehended: 7 January 1970

Wong Weng Siu (Chinese: 黄婉秀; (Note: Wong's Chinese name was also alternatively translated as Chinese: 黄永婵; pinyin: Huáng Yǒngchán) pinyin: Huáng Wǎnxìu; c. 1939 – 27 July 1973), more commonly known as Mimi Wong, was a Singaporean bar hostess who became the first woman to be sentenced to death and executed for murder in Singapore since its independence. Wong was alleged to have murdered Ayako Watanabe, the wife of her Japanese lover Hiroshi Watanabe, on 6 January 1970. Wong was not alone in this crime; her former husband and sweeper Sim Woh Kum had also helped Wong to restrain the victim while Wong repeatedly stabbed the woman to death.

The act was witnessed by Watanabe's eldest daughter Chieko (then aged 9), who testified against the couple in their 26-day trial. Wong's defence of diminished responsibility was rejected by the High Court, which found both herself and Sim guilty of Watanabe's murder and sentenced them to death, which also made them the first couple to be subjected to capital punishment in Singapore since its independence in 1965. Both were executed on 27 July 1973.

== Early life ==
Mimi Wong, birth name Wong Weng Siu, was born in 1939 at Singapore, Straits Settlements. She was the offspring of her father's second wife.

According to articles that covered her case, it was said that Wong had an unhappy childhood since her birth. Wong's father died of unknown causes when she was eleven months old. Her biological mother Leong Kuan Fong was so poor that she was unable to continue taking care of Wong, which led to her being sent to live with her father's first wife Ho Ah Soong and her nine half-siblings. Other than poverty, Wong suffered abuse from Ho and her siblings, who verbally and physically abused her at every moment, even at times in the presence of Wong's birth mother. Whenever it was mealtime, Wong's nine half-brothers and half-sisters were allowed to eat first, while Wong was not allowed to join them. She would only be given leftovers once the whole family finished eating. (Note: However, in court, the first wife Ho Ah Soong claimed that she was on good terms with Wong despite not being her flesh and blood.)

Wong did not have a chance to go to school during her childhood. She started to work at age fourteen, first becoming a factory worker to support herself. Despite this, Wong continued to live in extreme poverty.

== Marriage and separation ==
In 1956, the year she turned 17, Wong Weng Siu was invited to a picnic by a friend. During this time, she first met a HDB sweeper named Sim Woh Kum, who was six or seven years older than her. Sim was also working as a school canteen stallholder at the time he first knew Wong. Subsequently, both Wong and Sim became romantically involved. The couple dated for the next two years before they married in 1958. In that same year, both Wong and Sim welcomed their first son. Their second son was born four years later in 1962.

However, the marriage slowly became marred by marital issues and arguments. Wong, who possessed a bad temper since she was young, and with a family history of mental illnesses, was said to have frequently abused her husband, and would not hesitate to arm herself to physically assault Sim whenever their arguments turned violent. Sim, who was a naturally mild-tempered person, often silently endured these physical abuses, which at one point left a scar on his forehead. He even ran out of the house numerous times whenever Wong picked up a knife or wooden rod with intent to pick a fight. Wong even went as far as to abuse her own mother-in-law, which led to her being considered an "empress daughter-in-law" reminiscent of Wu Zetien.

Not only that, Sim himself was a compulsive gambler, who often gambled away their hard-earned money, which aggravated the family's already-precarious financial situation. The gambling habit would cost Sim his job and the family's life savings. This forced Wong to take up part-time jobs to support their family, including a stint at a bar as a hostess. Despite his loss of employment, Sim persisted in his gambling habits, and he sometimes stole Wong's hard-earned income to feed his own appetite for gambling. Given their financial difficulties and Sim's own incompetence, Wong was slowly disillusioned with Sim, and she ultimately decided to leave him in 1963, resulting in Sim having to take care of their two sons and his own elderly mother alone.

After her separation from Sim, Wong would purposely strut with her boyfriends in front of Sim, according to his account of his life before Ayako Watanabe's murder. Sim, who still loved Wong despite their separation, had always hoped that Wong would reconcile with him and often told her not to do that in front of him.

== Bar hostess career and relationships ==
After her separation from Sim Woh Kum, Wong Weng Siu went on to work as a cabaret girl in a bar, adopting a stage name "Mimi Wong". Using her good looks and slender, sexually-attractive figure, Wong quickly earned popularity among the male customers of the bar. Wong's reputation was so huge that she even became the queen of all bar hostesses in Singapore.

In 1966, three years after she first started her bar hostess career, Wong first met Hiroshi Watanabe (渡边弘), an engineer and high-ranking member of a Japanese corporation. Watanabe was first sent to Singapore in January 1966 and was first assigned a job to carry out a reclamation project in the eastern part of Singapore. His wife and three children - a son and two daughters - remained in Japan. When they first met, Watanabe instantly became attracted to Wong. He would later on frequently go to the bar just to interact with Wong, who slowly became attracted to Watanabe as well. They later became lovers, though Watanabe himself could not bear to abandon his wife for Wong, for he still harboured feelings for his wife despite the infidelity, and Wong herself knew that their illicit relationship will not end well given Watanabe's status as a married man.

Eventually, Wong became pregnant with Watanabe's child. Despite asking for money from Hiroshi for an abortion, Watanabe declined her request by claiming that he had no cash. Wong later travelled to Penang for an abortion. Despite this, the two maintained their relationship. Simultaneously, in 1968, two years into her relationship with Watanabe, Wong met a Hong Kong businessman, who also fell for her and started a relationship with Wong. Wong later separated from Watanabe and stayed together with the Hong Kong businessman. Despite this, she wrote Watanabe (who remained in Singapore) love letters. Wong's relationship with the businessman did not last long, as when the man found out that Wong was pregnant with his child, he drove her out of his house. This time, Wong did not abort the fetus, and in 1969, after she returned to Singapore, she gave birth to a daughter. She temporarily took up a job as a social escort to eke out a living.

Aside from her return to Singapore, Watanabe continued to visit Wong, who officially became his mistress. Every month, Watanabe gave her $200 out of his income to support her, and he rented a room at Alexandra Road for her. A few months later, the couple moved to Everitt Road and lived together with Wong's daughter, and Wong also hired a servant to tend the house.

== Murder of Ayako Watanabe ==
=== Mimi Wong's first meeting with Ayako Watanabe ===
In late-1969, three years into his relationship with Mimi Wong, Hiroshi Watanabe decided to admit to his wife that he indeed had an affair with another woman. According to Watanabe, his wife did not approve of his affair with Wong. Watanabe could not end the relationship immediately, as he knew that Wong had a bad temper besides being able to drink a lot of alcohol. When Wong became aware of this, Watanabe was given some hints from Wong that something drastic would happen to his wife or him or his family if he ever dared to cut off ties with her.

By then, Watanabe did harbour thoughts of leaving Wong as he could not bear to leave his wife and children, but he was afraid of what Wong would do if he really ended the affair. Hence, Watanabe decided to persuade his wife to come to Singapore with their children, to meet up with Wong. When she received news that Watanabe’s wife would be coming to Singapore with their three kids, Wong was enraged to hear this and abused Watanabe. Gradually, it took some time for Watanabe to finally persuade Wong to meet his wife and children.

On 23 December 1969, Watanabe's wife Ayako Watanabe (渡辺 绫子) and her three children arrived in Singapore by flight. Hiroshi Watanabe took his family to Everitt Road where they first met Wong and her daughter. Despite welcoming the family into the house and treating them nicely, Wong was writhing in jealousy behind this facade of kindness and politeness. Subsequently, the Watanabe family went to live in a rented house in Jalan Sea View.

Despite her hatred and envy, Wong tried her best to be nice towards the family, and even offered sweets to the three children, who called her "Obasan" (which meant aunt in Japanese). In fact, when she saw Watanabe's loving and warm attitude with his wife and children, she could not bring herself to do anything to tear apart the family despite the jealousy. However, on New Year's Eve, after a party, Hiroshi Watanabe came back intoxicated with too much alcohol, and during his drunken conversation with Wong, he allegedly said that his wife called Wong a prostitute. This greatly offended Wong. In combination with her prior jealousy, Wong could not resist her emotions any further.

Wong went back to her estranged husband Sim Woh Kum, then aged 37, to tell him about her plans to kill Ayako. Wong even offered Sim some money if he could help her to do the job. Despite his own reservations about committing murder, Sim decided to accept the offer for he still loved Wong and he was facing huge financial troubles while alone taking care of his mother and two sons.

=== Murder ===
On 6 January 1970, Wong and Watanabe shared a dinner at their Everitt Road house. Wong asked Watanabe if he could spend the night with her. Watanabe declined, saying that he would be working overtime, and once he finished his work for the day, he would go back to Jalan Sea View to spend the night with his family. Upon hearing this, Wong realised this was a good chance for her to get back at Ayako.

Both Wong and Sim went together to the Jalan Sea View house where the Watanabes were spending the night. Wong brought along a pair of gloves and a knife, while Sim took a tin half-filled with toilet-cleaning liquid, in order to pretend to be a toilet cleaner coming to clean the house. When Ayako saw Wong and Sim, she asked the woman what she wanted. After hearing Wong telling her that she had brought a worker to repair a broken toilet basin, Ayako allowed them in.

While the 33-year-old Japanese woman was welcoming her visitors into the house, the Watanabes' eldest daughter, nine-year-old Chieko Watanabe (渡辺 千惠子), was inside her bedroom with her two younger siblings (a boy and a girl), and she could not fall asleep despite her efforts to do so. She heard screaming and looked out to see her mother being attacked by both Sim and Wong inside the toilet. Sim had earlier threw some of the toilet cleaning liquid inside Ayako Watanabe's eyes, and covered her mouth (not without getting bitten on the finger) to stop her from shouting, while Wong used the knife to stab at Ayako. Chieko shrieked out of shock and cried over what happened, which attracted the attention of both Wong and Sim. Quickly, Wong abandoned the task of stabbing Ayako and covered the little girl's mouth. The girl stopped crying and quickly rushed into her room to get her brother and sister to wake up. After which, Chieko ran out and get to her mother, who was bleeding massively and died shortly after staggering towards her eldest daughter. By then, Wong and Sim were also seen running out of the house and escaped. Wong went to her amah to temporarily seek refuge while Sim went to his friend's flat to ask him to rent a room for Wong. According to some witnesses who encountered Wong before her arrest, they claimed that Wong, who took her daughter with her during her escape, told them that she had stabbed a Japanese woman while drunk.

Hiroshi Watanabe returned later that night. He went inside the house and was shocked to see his three children crying over the corpse of his deceased wife, which sent the 37-year-old mechanical engineer into hysterics. Hiroshi then asked his daughter what had happened, and Chieko told him that she saw Wong and a man she did not know attacking her mother. Police were contacted and police officer Tan Kim Hai headed the investigations. The investigations led to the police arresting both Wong and Sim the next day. Wong and Sim were both identified out of an identification parade by Chieko, who would become the prosecution's key witness against the couple in their trial. Wong and Sim were charged with Ayako's murder.

Meanwhile, the corpse of Ayako was taken to the mortuary, where forensic pathologist Chao Tzee Cheng examined the body. Professor Chao found two knife wounds on Ayako Watanabe's neck, and one to her abdomen, along with a few others. There were two fatal wounds that caused the woman's death - one to the neck and one to the abdomen. Chao also made a certified finding that the woman died around 5 to 6 minutes after the fatal wounds were inflicted on her, which cut through the major blood vessels and caused her to die. Professor Chao was also certain that these wounds were not self-inflicted by Ayako in the form of suicide, given that she was not a left-hander and these wounds were mainly located on the right side, making it hard for her to stab herself with the left hand. He was also certain that there were other people in the toilet where they died, thus fitting the notion that Wong and Sim had done the killing together.

== Trial ==
In November 1970, the trial of Mimi Wong and Sim Woh Kum began to take place. The prosecutor prosecuting the couple was Francis Seow. Lawyers N C Goho and John Tan Chor Yong were assigned to represent Wong and Sim respectively in their defence.

At the trial, both Wong and Sim accused each other of masterminding the murder. Wong accused her husband for being the sole person who killed Ayako; she said that when she was fighting in the toilet with Ayako, Sim separated them both, and he stabbed the victim when she left the bathroom. Aside from this, she even put up a defence of diminished responsibility, stating that she was intoxicated with alcohol at the time of the crime. Additionally, Wong's psychiatrist, Dr Wong Yip Chong (unrelated to Mimi Wong), also claimed that she had caught the Japanese encephalitis virus from Hiroshi Watanabe and thus suffered from a viral brain infection at the time of the killing, which impaired her mental responsibility. However, the prosecution psychiatrist stated that Wong was of sound mind when she killed Ayako.

On the other hand, while Sim initially confessed to the police that he indeed helped his wife to kill the victim, he denied helping to kill and instead stated that he tried to stop the two women from fighting, and because he was using his hands to separate the two women, he got bitten on his right hand by Ayako, who was being stabbed by Wong during the scuffle. A psychiatrist was also called to testify about Sim's character, saying that he was a well-mannered and also a simple, naive individual. Sim even accused Wong of being a gang member of the "Red Butterfly" gang, which consisted of female triad members.

A headline of the Straits Times article featuring the verdict of Mimi Wong's trial

After a trial lasting 26 days, on 7 December 1970, High Court judge Tan Ah Tah pronounced the verdict in court. Wong and Sim were found guilty of murder and sentenced to death for murdering Ayako Watanabe. The two judges, Tan Ah Tah and Choor Singh, found that Wong was indeed in control of her mental faculties and thus was not mentally abnormal at the time of her crime, and had intended to murder Ayako out of jealousy over the possible break-up Hiroshi would initiate with her. As for Sim, the judges felt that he should take full responsibility of committing the murder since he shared the common intention with Wong to do the act, hence they sentenced him to death together with Wong.

== Death row and execution ==
=== Wong’s two appeals ===
After she was sentenced to death, Mimi Wong was transferred to Changi Prison, where she was incarcerated on death row while pending her appeals and possible execution. Wong's appeal was first heard in March 1972, with prominent lawyer David Saul Marshall arguing her appeal on her behalf. Wong's appeal was heard in the same court as Sim's. In the appeal, among the eleven grounds of his appeal, Marshall mainly argued that the trial judges did not give equal weight of consideration when they faced the parts of evidence that were in Wong's favour, including her evidence of diminished responsibility.

Marshall also said there was an error for the judges to determine that Wong had indeed stabbed Ayako Watanabe with the intention to cause her death or any bodily injury that resulted in death, and thus he said Wong did not receive a fair trial. In response, the prosecution argued that Wong had indeed premeditated the murder of Ayako and stated that she did not suffer from abnormality of the mind from her awareness to quickly clean the blood from herself and her clothes after the killing and prior knowledge of Ayako's prowess in martial arts (which was why she brought Sim along). After hearing the appeal, the three judges from the Court of Appeal - T Kulasekaram, Frederick Arthur Chua (aka F A Chua) and Wee Chong Jin (then Chief Justice of Singapore) - rejected Wong's appeal on 23 July 1972, as they were satisfied that there was no miscarriage of justice in Wong's case. Sim also lost his appeal on the same day, as the judges found that he, unlike what his lawyers argued, indeed shared a common intention with Wong to kill Ayako, and he thus should be guilty of murder.

Both Sim and Wong then filed for a special leave to appeal to the Judicial Committee of the Privy Council in London. Their requests were denied by the Privy Council. Marshall then applied for an appeal to the President of Singapore for clemency, imploring the President to commute Wong's death sentence to life imprisonment, on behalf of humanitarian grounds (Wong's life of poverty and pitiful childhood) and a chance to rehabilitate Wong, who he claimed had wanted to repent for what she did and became committed to religion in prison.

However, on the advice of the Cabinet, then-President Benjamin Sheares declined to grant Wong clemency and dismissed her petition on 23 July 1973, hereby finalizing Wong's death sentence. Wong's case was subsequently assigned to the then-Chief Justice of Singapore Wee Chong Jin, who would fix a date for Wong to be executed, to which the sentence would be carried out within the next three weeks after a clemency plea is rejected. Similarly, the clemency appeal of Wong's accomplice Sim Woh Kum was also rejected.

Eventually, Wong's execution was scheduled to take place on 27 July 1973. Sim's execution was also ordered to be carried out on the same day as well.

=== Life on death row ===
While she was appealing against her sentence and awaiting her execution, Wong continued to spend the remaining years of her life in solitary confinement at death row. According to Jeleha Haji Said, the wife of a Changi Prison officer, Wong was described to be a difficult inmate who often behaved in bizarre ways, notably stripping herself naked at times in the prison. Often, the advice from the prison guards to put on her clothes fell on deaf ears, and Wong would also take an opportunity to throw urine at the prison wardens every time it happened.

Jeleha added that, when such things happened, her husband Darshan Singh (executioner), who was also the prison complex's chief executioner, would step in to try to calm her down. Often, it was shown that Singh was the only person capable of calming Wong down and dissuading her from her unruly behaviour. According to Singh's wife, her husband would say, "Mimi (Wong), wear the blanket and cover yourself. Don't do this or you won't be beautiful any more", and she would listen to him.

Apart from these experiences, Wong and Singh formed an unlikely friendship with each other during Wong's stay on death row. During this time, Singh's other colleagues from the prison often joked that Wong was his girlfriend, and Singh apparently did not mind them. Singh's wife Jeleha also added that her husband was a very charming man, especially with women. Additionally, Wong converted to Christianity while in prison. She embraced her Protestant faith and spent her time reading the Bible in her cell.

=== Execution ===
On 27 July 1973, nearly three years and seven months after murdering Watanabe and five days after losing her plea for clemency, 34-year-old Mimi Wong and her 40-year-old husband Sim Woh Kum were both hanged at dawn, with executioner Darshan Singh carrying out the executions. On the same day of Wong's execution, another convicted murderer, Osman bin Ali, a gardener who killed a cook and an amah in Leedon Park in November 1970, was executed at around the same time as Wong and Sim's executions.

Before she was executed, Wong requested to die while wearing her wedding gown from her past marriage with Sim. Her final wish was granted, and thus she wore it as she entered the gallows. It was said that before her execution, Wong had made a wish to become lovers with Singh in her next life, and take him with her. After Wong entered the gallows, Singh fell extremely ill for over a month after executing Wong, and he was hospitalized for the first two weeks in Toa Payoh Hospital. 48 years after he carried out Wong's execution, Singh, who retired in 2005, died at the age of 89 due to COVID-19 in October 2021; Wong was among the most notable persons whom Singh had executed during his career as the hangman.

=== Burial ===
After her execution, Wong was buried side by side with Sim in an unspecified cemetery. Her daughter, then four years old, placed flowers on her grave, with a note that contained a message, "To my beloved mother." The couple's two sons were being taken care of by social welfare organizations, while Sim's mother was cared for in an elderly resident's home, where she lived out her life.

== Significance ==
In the aftermath of the case, both Mimi Wong and Sim Woh Kum were the first couple to be sentenced to death and executed in Singapore since its independence. Simultaneously, Wong was also the first woman to be executed in Singapore since its independence from both British colonial rule and Malaysia. Her case gained notoriety since its occurrence, and it was considered to be one of the most shocking murder cases which Singapore had faced in its years as an independent nation.

Prior to Wong's execution, there was only one woman who was judicially hanged in Singapore a century ago. Lim Ah Tek, along with her paramour Choa Chwee, were convicted of murdering Lim's husband and sentenced to death, and they were hanged on 22 December 1880, 93 years before Wong's execution.

=== In popular media ===
In July 2015, more than 45 years after the murder of Ayako Watanabe, Singapore's national daily newspaper The Straits Times published a e-book titled Guilty As Charged: 25 Crimes That Have Shaken Singapore Since 1965, which included the case of Mimi Wong. The book was borne out of collaboration between the Singapore Police Force and the newspaper itself. The e-book was edited by ST News Associate editor Abdul Hafiz bin Abdul Samad. The paperback edition of the book was published and first hit bookshelves in June 2017. The paperback edition first entered the ST bestseller list on 8 August 2017, a month after publication.

Singaporean crime show Crimes and Tribulations, a 1997 Chinese-language crime show, was the first television series to re-enact the case of Mimi Wong, and the re-enactment aired as the fourth episode of the show in 1997. Another crime documentary series True Files re-enacted the case of Mimi Wong, and the re-enactment first aired as the second episode of the show's first season on 30 April 2002. The episode is currently viewable via meWATCH (previously named Toggle) since 5 February 2016. Wong was portrayed by Singaporean actress Eve Ooi, while her husband was portrayed by Singaporean actor Tommy Tan. The case was also re-enacted in crime show Whispers of the Dead, which also re-enact the notable cases solved by forensic pathologist Chao Tzee Cheng; the episode was aired in 2014 as the second episode of the show's first season. In this re-enactment, the identities of the people involved were changed to protect their identities. For example, Wong was renamed as Suzie Tay, while Sim was renamed as Lau Teck Seng, and the victim Ayako Watanabe was renamed as Aika Nakamura in this re-enactment.

=== Subsequent cases of female killers executed in Singapore ===
Mimi Wong herself would not be the only woman to be sentenced to death for murder by the state in Singapore's legal history. One notable example was the 1981 Adrian Lim murders, where two women, Catherine Tan Mui Choo and Hoe Kah Hong, who helped a self-styled medium Adrian Lim to murder two children, were sentenced to death and executed in the same gallows as Lim for murder.

In 1986, See Seow Beng, a 38-year-old housewife, was sentenced to death after being found guilty of killing a 61-year-old female sweeper Yap Soh Keow in 1983, due to the judges rejecting her defence of sudden and grave provocation. See lost her appeal the following year, and she was eventually hanged.

Another case was the Lim Lee Tin murder case in 1989. Lim's gambling partner and 29-year-old married housewife Chin Seow Noi, Chin's 27-year-old younger brother Chin Yau Kim and the Chin siblings' 31-year-old friend Ng Kim Heng conspired to kill Lim as Lim repeatedly harassed Chin Seow Noi for money. The three killers were sentenced to death for murder and executed on 31 March 1995.

Another example included the 1999 murder of retired inspector T. Maniam, which was committed by the retired police officer's wife, Julaiha Begum, who plotted with three to four men to murder her husband in order to get full ownership of the family house at Phoenix Garden. Julaiha and two of the killers Chandran Rajagopal and Loganatha Venkatesan were executed in 2001, while the fourth fled Singapore till today and the fifth declining to help do the killing.

In another case, Filipino domestic maid Flor Contemplacion was charged and later executed in March 1995 for killing her friend Delia Maga and four-year-old Nicholas Huang, the son of her friend's employer. The controversial execution of Contemplacion despite her alleged innocence and mental disability caused deterioration in the diplomatic ties between Singapore and the Philippines within the next few years.

Teo Kim Hong, a prostitute, was hanged on 30 August 1996 for the murder of her Malaysian friend and fellow prostitute Ching Bee Ing, whom she killed while Ching was in her sleep on 8 August 1995.

Another woman to be hanged in Singapore's gallows was Gerardine Andrew, who conspired with her two male friends Mansoor Abdullah and Nazar Mohamed Kassim and another woman called Kamala Rani Balakrishnan to rob and assault her landlady Sivapackiam Veerappan Rengasamy. Sivapackiam was unexpectedly stabbed to death by Nazar during the course of robbery and assault. Given that she masterminded the robbery and was aware that the men were armed with dangerous weapons, Gerardine was sentenced to death with the men for her landlady's murder, and they were all hanged in 1999. Kamala, who played the most minor role out of the four, was instead jailed for conspiracy to rob and kill the landlady.

== See also ==
- Sim Woh Kum
- Capital punishment in Singapore
- List of major crimes in Singapore
