= Ashoka the Hero =

- Film's official cover art
- Directed by: Gaurav Jain
- Written by: Gaurav Jain
- Produced by: Gautam Jain; Rahul Merchant; Gyanendra Jain; Palak Jain
- Starring: Amol Kadam; Deepak Kale; Parashar Rane; Nitin Satam; Ravi Zade; Naresh Bhurke; Sanghpal Chavan; Titus Kujur; Sachin Pednekar
- Music by: Justin & Uday
- Production company: Illusion Interactive
- Distributed by: Springboard Films
- Release date: 7 January 2011
- Running time: 90 minutes
- Country: India
- Language: Hindi

Ashoka the Hero is a 2011 Indian Hindi-language animated film written and directed by Gaurav Jain. The film was promoted as Indian's first animated superhero film.

== Plot ==
An eight-year-old school going boy got some hidden magical powers, and he must use them to save mankind from evils.

== Soundtrack ==
The film's soundtrack is composed by Justin-Uday and its lyrics is written by Rekha Nigam.

=== Track listing ===
- "Here He Comes Ashoka" by Shibani Kashyap
- "Roshni Se" - Instrumental

== Release and reception ==
This film was released in theatres on 7 January 2011, but it got 25 prints only.

Blessy Chettiar of DNA rated the film two out of five stars and wrote, "Ashoka makes for a light weekend watch with your child, but don’t expect to leave the theatre overwhelmed". Anna M. M. Vetticad dismissed the film, refused to rate it out of five and wrote, "The animation looks dated, the movement of the figures is stodgy. Good Indian animation films are hard to come by, but an overall low standard can hardly be an excuse!"

== Box office ==
The film grossed an estimated ₹3 lakh (US$3,100) at the box office, against a budget of ₹1.5 crore (US$160,000) and declared as "disaster" by boxofficeindia. It earned ₹50,000 on first day, ₹1,50,000 on first weekend and a sum of ₹2,10,000 on its first week.
