= Gold Bars triple murders =

1971 high-profile robbery-murder case in Singapore

- Criminal Investigation Department officers inspecting the recovered gold bars
- Date: 29 December 1971; 54 years ago
- Location: Serangoon, Singapore
- Outcome: Perpetrator Augustine Ang Cheng Siong indefinitely imprisoned without trial and given a discharge not amounting to an acquittal per a deal with the prosecution; Ang turned state evidence against his nine accomplices as part of the same deal; Remaining perpetrators found guilty of murder on 4 December 1972; Ringo Lee and Stephen Lee imprisoned indefinitely at the President's Pleasure on 4 December 1972; Chou brothers, Yau, Lim, James, Francis, Konesekaram sentenced to hang on 4 December 1972; Chou brothers, Yau, Lim, James, Francis, Konesekaram hanged on 28 February 1975; Ang, Ringo Lee and Stephen Lee released between late 1980s and 1990s
- Deaths: Ngo Cheng Poh (55); Ang Boon Chai (57); Leong Chin Woo (51)
- Convicted: Andrew Chou Hock Guan (31); David Chou Hock Heng (34); Peter Lim Swee Guan (24); Alex Yau Hean Thye (19); Richard James (18); Stephen Francis (20); Ringo Lee Chiew Chwee (16); Stephen Lee Hock Khoon (16); Konesekaram Nagalingam (18)
- Verdict: Guilty
- Convictions: Murder (three counts)
- Sentence: Death – Chou brothers, Yau, Lim, James, Francis, Konesekaram; Indefinite detention at the President's Pleasure – Ringo Lee and Stephen Lee

On 29 December 1971, the Gold Bars triple murders occurred when Ngo Cheng Poh (Chinese: 吴崇波; pinyin: Wú Chóngbō), a 55-year-old businessman and gold bar smuggler, was murdered by a group of ten men alongside his employees, 57-year-old Ang Boon Chai (Chinese: 洪文彩; pinyin: Hóng Wéncǎi) and 51-year-old Leong Chin Woo (Chinese: 梁振伍; pinyin: Liáng Zhènwǔ). The group also robbed the three men of 120 gold bars worth S$500,000. The robbery-murder was masterminded by 31-year-old Andrew Chou Hock Guan (Chinese: 邹福源; pinyin: Zōu Fúyuán), an air cargo supervisor who had been a middleman for Ngo's smuggling of gold onto flights from Singapore to Vietnam. He decided to commit the robbery due to an event that deteriorated Chou's ties to gold bar syndicates.

After a trial lasting 40 days, Andrew Chou, his 34-year-old brother David Chou Hock Heng (Chinese: 邹福兴; pinyin: Zōu Fúxīng), and five out of the remaining eight perpetrators were sentenced to death for murdering the three gold smugglers. The remaining three were placed under indefinite detention; two of them were minors at the time of the offence while the other became the prosecution's chief witness. After losing their appeals, the seven condemned were hanged on 28 February 1975.

== Murder investigation ==
On 30 December 1971, while conducting training inside a jungle in Bedok, several National Servicemen discovered three dead bodies, all of whom were male. The bodies were found to have cloth wrapped around them, and green nylon rope was tied around their necks and limbs. After the start of investigations, the police were able to ascertain the identities of the men, having traced back to a missing persons report made by the wife of one. One of them was identified as Ngo Cheng Poh, a 55-year-old import-export company owner. Ngo, who was originally from Hong Kong before immigrating to Singapore, had a wife and five children at death. The remaining two victims were Ngo's employees: 57-year-old Ang Boon Chai and 51-year-old Leong Chin Woo. Leong had a wife, four sons and one daughter, while Ang had a wife and four children. The police later discovered two abandoned cars which belonged to the victims. Forensic pathologist Chao Tzee Cheng determined that the cause of death was strangulation, and also that the three victims were assaulted prior to their deaths. He also deduced that the three men had died between 30 and 36 hours before their bodies were discovered.

Goh Cheng Hong, Ngo's widow, told the police that her husband traded in gold and was supposed to drop by a business partner's house on the night of 29 December 1971 to deliver 120 gold bars to them. The partner was 31-year-old air cargo supervisor Andrew Chou Hock Guan. She also told the police that Chou had called her on the night itself, saying that Ngo did not arrive at his house as agreed upon. Goh subsequently accompanied Leong's wife in filing a police report that reported their husbands missing. The report was filed two hours prior to the discovery of the bodies.

The police approached Andrew Chou and his 34-year-old brother, David Chou Hock Heng, who was a university graduate working at a pharmaceutical company, and questioned them. They noticed that Andrew's right hand was bandaged while David had several scratch marks on his chest. Andrew stated that the injuries were the result of an overly rough karate practice. The next day, the police inspected the house of the Chou brothers, where they lived with their mother, sister and David's two daughters (he was divorced at the time). Several bloodstains were found at the front yard of the house, and the green rope used to hang clothes outside the house was found to match the rope around the necks of the three victims.

The Chou brothers confessed that they were responsible for a gold bar robbery that killed Ngo and his associates, while stating that another eight people were also involved. Following the revelation, the remaining eight accomplices were arrested. Two of them were Andrew Chou's friends: 24-year-old clerk Peter Lim Swee Guan (Chinese: 林瑞源; pinyin: Lín Ruìyuán) and 25-year-old Augustine Ang Cheng Siong (Chinese: 洪振祥; pinyin: Hóng Zhènxiáng), (Note: Alternatively known in Chinese as 洪清祥 (pinyin: Hóng Qīngxiáng).) who were both involved in planning the robbery-murder alongside the Chou brothers. The remaining six accomplices arrested were youths hired by the four. The six youths were identified as 20-year-old Stephen Francis, 19-year-old Alex Yau Hean Thye (Chinese: 姚贤泰; pinyin: Yáo Xiántài) (Note: Alternatively known in Chinese as 姚显泰 (pinyin: Yáo Xiǎntài).), 18-year-old Konesekaram Nagalingam, 18-year-old Richard James, 16-year-old Stephen Lee Hock Khoon (Chinese: 李福坤; pinyin: Lǐ Fúkūn) and 16-year-old Ringo Lee Chiew Chwee (Chinese: 李秋水; pinyin: Lǐ Qiūshuǐ). (Note: Alternatively known in Chinese as 李兆瑞 (pinyin: Lǐ Zhàoruì) or 李洲瑞 (pinyin: Lǐ Zhōuruì).) Subsequently, all the ten suspects were charged with three counts of murdering Ngo, Ang and Leong.

The police also managed to recover all the 120 gold bars several days after the murders. Five of the gold bars were found inside David Chou's office in his workplace, while the remaining 115 gold bars, packed in bundles of five, were found in the home of Lim's aunt, Catherine Ang, who was supposed to help sell them. These gold bars, which were confiscated by the police, reportedly had a net worth of S$500,000.

== Trial ==
=== Augustine Ang's discharge and detention without trial ===
On 10 October 1972, the Gold Bars triple murder trial took place at the High Court, with two veteran judges—Justice Choor Singh and Justice Frederick Arthur Chua—presiding over the trial. However, Ang did not stand trial, as he had been granted a discharge not amounting to an acquittal and indefinitely detained without trial under the Criminal Law (Temporary Provisions) Act. His discharge without trial was attributed to his confession to having taken part in the murders and the sustained consistency of his testimony; he also became the prosecution's chief witness against his nine accomplices, who all pleaded not guilty to the three counts of murder.

=== Prosecution's case ===
The trial court heard that in early 1971, Andrew Chou, then an air cargo supervisor at Air Vietnam, began to act as a middleman for several gold bar syndicates and transport gold bars from Singapore to Vietnam through Vietnamese flights departing from Singapore; Ngo belonged to one such syndicate. The syndicate members would often drop the gold bars at Chou's home in Upper Serangoon, and he would assist them in evading security while they smuggled the gold onto said flights. In return, Chou would receive a total of US$15 per one-kilogram gold bar each from both the foreign and local smuggling superiors. He performed the routine two to three times weekly for several months. However, in October 1971, the relationship between Chou and the syndicates began to deteriorate when a bag that contained about US$235,000 in cash was lost at the airport after arriving on an Air Vietnam flight. Chou had been in charge of collecting the bag of money, and recovered about US$180,000 from airport staff under threat from the syndicates. However, the rest of the money was never recovered, and Chou's income from gold smuggling was considerably reduced as he had lost the syndicates' trust.

The prosecution, led by Solicitor-General Abdul Wahab Ghows and Senior State Counsel S. Rajendran, alleged that Andrew Chou was the mastermind who planned and arranged for the robbery-murder plot over the syndicates' loss of trust in him. David Chou, Ang and Lim were alleged to be primary subordinates who assisted him in planning the crime and recruiting several youths to kill Ngo and his associates at the next arranged delivery of smuggled gold.

Francis, James, Konesekaram and Ringo Lee were not involved at the beginning of the robbery-murder plot. Andrew Chou and the primary subordinates had initially gathered a batch of five youths to assist in murdering the victims. They included Alex Yau, Stephen Lee and three other youths—Fernando Lee Beng Hong, Ringo's elder brother, Soh Ah Seng and a third boy known only as "Anchor". However, the latter three backed out of the plan, leading to the four participants entering the plot.

=== Ang's testimony ===
From this point on, the prosecution's case relied on Ang's evidence; he took the stand on the tenth day of the Gold Bars triple murder trial. He testified that he, together with the Chou brothers and Peter Lim, first started to plan the robbery in November 1971. Lim was in charge of recruiting youths to assist them in robbing and murdering Ngo and his associates, and Ang himself was to instruct the six boys—Konesekaram, Stephen Lee, Ringo Lee, Francis, James and Yau—about their plan to rob and murder the three victims, promising each of them S$20,000 as a reward. Ang also recounted that on the night of 29 December 1971, after ensuring that the mother and sister of the Chou brothers, as well as David's two daughters, were fully asleep, the ten perpetrators gathered at the Chou family home to wait for Ngo's arrival. After the arrival of Ngo and his two associates Ang Boon Chai and Leong Chin Woo, Ngo and Leong alighted their respective vehicles and passed Andrew Chou a bag containing 120 gold bars. After receiving the bag, the ten men began to attack the three victims. Ang stated that he pinned down Ngo's legs while the latter was being strangled by Andrew Chou, and also witnessed David Chou using the green rope to strangle Leong. Ang Boon Chai was the last victim to be assaulted; Augustine Ang said that, after seeing that Andrew Chou had inflicted several punches and karate chops onto Ang Boon Chai's neck and head, he picked up a wooden block to carry out repeated beatings until Ang Boon Chai fell unconscious.

After killing the three men (who all died from strangulation), the ten men covered the bodies; coincidentally, two of the Chou family's neighbours, a married couple, had just arrived home from watching a movie. To escape suspicion, David Chou went to greet the couple and ensure that they had not seen the aftermath of the murder, and Andrew Chou pretended that he was drunk and talking to the other eight men, who were standing around the bodies to prevent the couple's detection. Later, while Ang and the Chou brothers stayed behind to clean up the crime scene, the other accomplices helped to transport the bodies to a disused well in Changi; however, the boys left the bodies in thick bushes beside an old mining pond in Lembah Bedok. The two cars belonging to Ngo and Leong were also abandoned by the killers.

After completing his testimony on the stand, Ang was cross-examined on the stand by the nine accused's six defence counsels: Giam Chin Toon (David Chou's lawyer), Wong Peng Khoon (Andrew Chou's lawyer), N. C. Goho (who represented Francis, James and Konesekaram), Leo Fernando (Yau's lawyer), John Tan Chor-Yong (who defended Ringo Lee and Stephen Lee) and G. Gopalan (Lim's lawyer). During the 33-hour long cross-examination of Ang, they sought to question his credibility as the prosecution's key witness, and tried to present him as an unreliable witness willing to save himself by betraying his accomplices. Ang, who admitted that he had joined the robbery in order to get rich, conceded on the stand that he did accept the prosecution's offer to turn state evidence against his accomplices out of a desperation to avoid the death penalty, while denying that he would lie to save himself. He also stated that he was fully aware of the indefinite detention resulting from the deal and that the discharge included did not amount to an acquittal or pardon. When the lawyers representing the Chou brothers attempted to assert that Ang was the true mastermind who initially suggested the robbery-murder, the key basis of their defence, Ang denied that account as well. He spent ten days taking the stand, including his testimony and cross-examination.

=== Defence ===
When called to give their defence, the Chou brothers asserted that Ang was the true mastermind of the robbery-murder. Andrew Chou, who first took the stand on 21 November 1972, testified that he and Ang first met through David and became close friends. Ang would often accompany Chou during his deliveries of gold and take a cut from his earnings. After the missing money incident in October 1971, Ang first suggested that he and Chou should rob Ngo of his gold at Chou's next assignment to deliver it. Chou said that, as it potentially involved violence, he never agreed to the plan, and felt that the robbery was unreasonable given his existing good salary as a smuggling assistant. After some persuasion, Chou agreed to Ang's plan, which originally comprised kidnapping Ngo and selling the gold he received for money; they were to subsequently release Ngo and return part of the gold to him. He also accused Ang of causing the murders as the original recruiter for the robbery. David Chou similarly testified that Ang was the mastermind; according to himself, he only joined the plan at the last moment after agreeing to another offer by Andrew to do so, and helped to catch one of the victims. He also stated that the victims were still alive when their bodies were brought out.

Lim was the third defendant to be called. He stated that Ang had tasked him with transporting the stolen gold and that he had never participated in the planning of the murders, and wholly blamed Ang for being the prime mover of the robbery-murder. Among the remaining six defendants, some of them chose to give unsworn statements on the dock, while the remainder took the stand to give evidence. All stated that they had only assisted in the disposal of the victims' bodies. Yau stated that he did not kill anyone during the robbery. Stephen Lee testified that he had never known of the plot's intent to murder; he also alleged that Ang had paid him hush money and threatened him when he wanted to back out of the plot. The rest of the accused—Konesekaram, Francis, James, and Ringo Lee—claimed that they had never known about the robbery. While summarising their submissions, the defence counsels urged the court to reject Ang's testimony, saying that his evidence was untrustworthy.

=== Verdict ===
On 4 December 1972, after a 40-day trial, Chua delivered the verdict of the two judges. They agreed that, notwithstanding his reprehensible conduct and the risks of solely relying on his evidence, Augustine Ang was by all means a truthful witness, and rejected the defence's attempt to impeach his credibility as the prosecution's key witness. The rejection was attributed to Ang's consistency throughout his testimony, and that his account was validated when presented in light of the other evidence and testimonies. They also rejected the nine accused's respective accounts, and were convinced that Andrew Chou was the "prime mover" of the conspiracy behind the gold heist, with his role as a middleman in the gold deliveries being ruled to be instrumental in enabling the men to rob Ngo and his associates of the gold before killing them; Ang was portrayed as only following his decisions. David Chou and Lim were also found to have been Andrew Chou's principal collaborators as they had helped to take charge of the operation and recruited the boys; the remaining six youths were held equally responsible for their role in the murders.

The nine accused were thus found guilty of three counts of murder. However, Stephen Lee and Ringo Lee were imprisoned indefinitely at the President's Pleasure instead of receiving the death penalty as they were under the age of 18 during the murders. (Note: Stephen Lee was born on 27 October 1955 while Ringo Lee was born on 16 September 1955, hence they were confirmed to be underaged at the time of the murder.) On the other hand, the remaining seven accused – Andrew Chou, David Chou, Lim, Yau, Francis, James and Konesekaram Nagalingam (Note: Richard James's date of birth was 14 September 1953, Stephen Francis's date of birth was on 18 November 1951 and Konesekaram Nagalingam's date of birth was 29 September 1953, which confirmed that the three of them were above 18 when killing Ngo and the two other men, making them liable for the death penalty as well.) – were sentenced to death.

Tan, the lawyer representing both Stephen Lee and Ringo Lee, was allowed to submit a mitigation plea on behalf of the two boys prior to their sentencing to detention under the President's Pleasure. Tan submitted that Ringo Lee, a son of a provision shop owner, had lost his mother five years before, and he was the ninth of ten children, with two sisters and seven brothers. According to the plea, Lee had fallen into bad company and become involved in the murders; as a Christian, he wanted to have a second chance in life and had learnt his lesson. It was also submitted that Stephen Lee dropped out of school at age 13 to help his father at his electrical shop and had four older brothers and one younger sister. He found bad company and was manipulated by the adult perpetrators into killing the three men, and wished for a chance to reform himself.

It was reported that, after the death penalty was pronounced on the seven adult defendants, both Konesekaram's older sister and mother, as well as the female relatives of Francis and James, wept at the verdict, with one of them fainting. Yau began to cry while the remaining six condemned were silent and emotionless. Ang, who was also present in court, was reported to be visibly moved at the death sentence given to his former accomplices. The trial itself, which oversaw the imposition of capital punishment on seven people, was considered the second-biggest trial in Singapore's legal history since 1826, after the Pulau Senang murder trial hearing, which saw 18 out of 59 men sentenced to hang for killing four prison officers during a prison riot in Pulau Senang.

Ang was released in 1987 after serving 16 years in detention. One of the juveniles, Ringo Lee, was released after spending 17 years in prison, while Stephen Lee remained incarcerated as of 1993, before he was released in an unknown year.

== Appeal processes ==
In November 1973, the seven condemned perpetrators of the robbery-murder appealed to the Court of Appeal. They sought to overturn their convictions, similarly stating that Ang's testimony should not be trusted. The appeals were dismissed. By February 1974, the seven were among the 17 people held on Singapore's death row; the death row population dropped to 15 in October 1974. In 1974, they filed a motion that applied for special leave to appeal their convictions to the Privy Council in London; it was rejected in December of the same year.

As a last resort, the seven petitioned to the President of Singapore for clemency in January 1975. However, the petitions were rejected within a month by then-President Benjamin Sheares.

== Executions of the seven condemned ==
On 28 February 1975, the seven condemned – Andrew Chou, David Chou, Lim, Yau, Francis, James and Konesekaram – were hanged in Changi Prison at dawn. Over 200 relatives of the seven gathered outside the jail and reclaimed their bodies. An eighth execution also happened on the same date. The convict, identified as Ismail bin Abdul Rahman, was hanged for the 1973 murder of Karuppan Velusamy, a one-armed man. The State Coroner, several doctors and prison officers were present at the gallows when the eight men's death sentences were officially carried out.

Prior to their executions, the Chou brothers reportedly expressed their wish to donate their organs (mainly their kidneys and eyes) to those in need should it be decided that they were to be executed. However, due to inadequately-equipped medical facilities in the prison itself, their kidneys could not be donated. The brothers' corneas were transplanted onto a man and woman, who reportedly recovered well.

== Aftermath ==
=== Whereabouts of the stolen gold ===
Soon after the trial ended, a court inquiry was conducted to determine the owner of the gold bars; several claimants, including foreign businessmen, stepped forward and sought to claim said ownership. However, it was reported in 1981 that the gold bars were unclaimed and still in the treasury of the state, and that their worth had risen from the original cost of S$500,000 to S$3 million.

=== Ngo Cheng Poh's daughter ===
The death of Ngo impacted the life of one of his daughters. She was born in 1948 in Selangor, Malaysia, before her parents, who were both immigrants from Hong Kong, moved to Singapore. Described as a bright student who also gained fame as a top teen model, the daughter was emotionally harmed after her father's murder, leading to her becoming a career criminal. Allegedly, out of a desire to avenge her father's death, she joined a drug syndicate and was subsequently jailed for 12 years in London for drug trafficking. She later studied in prison and completed her university studies, and returned to Singapore to teach in university after her release on parole. However, she was imprisoned again after impersonating her younger sister to create a passport for herself.

=== In the media ===
The case was re-enacted on Crimewatch in 1993, in English and Chinese. It was also re-enacted on True Files, another Singaporean crime show. It first aired as the first episode of the show's first season on 23 April 2002 and is available on mewatch.

=== Publications ===
Singapore-based British journalist Alex Josey wrote a book about the case, titled The tenth man: Gold bar murders. It was first published in 1981.

In July 2015, The Straits Times (ST), Singapore's national daily newspaper, published an e-book titled Guilty as Charged: 25 Crimes That Have Shaken Singapore Since 1965, which included the Gold Bars triple murders as one of the top 25 crimes that had shocked the nation since its independence in 1965. The e-book was a collaboration between the Singapore Police Force and the newspaper itself. It was edited by ST News Associate editor Abdul Hafiz bin Abdul Samad. The paperback edition was published and first sold in end-June 2017, and entered the ST bestseller list on 8 August 2017, a month after its publication.

== See also ==
- List of major crimes in Singapore
