= Sim Woh Kum =

Accomplice of Mimi Wong and former sweeper executed for murder in Singapore

- Born: c. 1933; Singapore
- Died: 27 July 1973 (aged 40); Changi Prison, Singapore
- Cause of death: Execution by hanging
- Other name: Sim Wor Kum
- Status: Executed on 27 July 1973
- Conviction: Murder
- Penalty: Death
- Accomplice: Mimi Wong - Ex-wife (executed on 27 July 1973)

Details
- Victims: 1
- Date: 6 January 1970
- Country: Singapore
- Date apprehended: 7 January 1970

Sim Woh Kum (Chinese: 冼松锦; pinyin: Xiǎn Sōngjǐn; c. 1933 – 27 July 1973), also spelt Sim Wor Kum, was a Singaporean who was best known to be the accomplice of Mimi Wong, a bar hostess who was the first woman to be sentenced to death for murder in Singapore since its independence. Both Sim and Wong were alleged to have murdered Ayako Watanabe, who was the wife of Wong's Japanese lover on 6 January 1970. Sim had also helped Wong to restrain the victim while Wong repeatedly stabbed the woman to death. Both Sim and his wife were executed on 27 July 1973, making them the first couple to be subjected to capital punishment in Singapore since its independence in 1965.

== Early life ==
Sim Woh Kum was born in 1933, as the only child and son of his parents. His father died when he was ten years old, making him being raised by his mother. Sim had little to no education in his childhood, and he had to help his mother Yip Kum Koi to do manual labour. He became an apprentice of a mechanic at age 16, but he lost his job four years later. Sim then became a HDB sweeper and also worked part-time as a school canteen stallholder.

== Marriage with Mimi Wong ==
In 1956, at a picnic, Sim, then 23 years old, first met Wong Weng Siu, a 17-year-old woman was invited to the picnic by a friend. Subsequently, both Wong and Sim became romantically involved. The couple dated for the next two years before they married in 1958. The couple went on to have two sons, one in 1958 and another in 1962 respectively.

However, their happiness did not last long, as the couple began to argue frequently over family issues. Wong, who was said to be ill-tempered since young, frequently abused her husband and used weapons on Sim whenever their arguments turned violent. Sim, who had a mild-temper and calm personality, often silently endured these physical abuses, which at one point left a scar on his forehead. He even ran out of the house to escape any assaults a lot of times whenever Wong picked up a knife or wooden rod. Wong had also abuse her own mother-in-law, who considered her as an "empress daughter-in-law".

Not only that, Sim was addicted to gambling, and he always gambled away the couple's hard-earned money, which aggravated the family's already-precarious financial situation. Sim was later fired from his job because of this habit, and the family's life savings were subsequently spent away. This forced Wong having to go take up part-time jobs to support their family, including a stint at a bar as a hostess. Despite his loss of employment, Sim continued to gamble, and he sometimes stole Wong's hard-earned income to gamble. Given their financial difficulties and Sim's own incompetence, Wong was slowly becoming disillusioned with Sim, and she thus left him in 1963.

After her separation from Sim, Wong took up a job as a bar hostess. Under the stage name Mimi Wong, she earned fame among the male customers of the bar through her beauty and slim body figure, leading to her becoming the cabaret queen of the bar in Singapore. Since then, Wong would purposely go to strut with her boyfriends in front of Sim. Sim, who still loved Wong despite their separation, had always hoped that Wong would reconcile with him and often told her not to do that in front of him. During the couple's separation, Sim continued to take care of his mother and sons.

== Crime ==
In January 1970, Mimi Wong went back to her estranged husband Sim Woh Kum, then aged 37, to tell him about her plans to kill a Japanese woman. Wong even offered Sim some money if he could help her to do the job. Despite his own reservations about committing murder, Sim decided to accept the offer for he still loved Wong and he was facing huge financial troubles while alone taking care of his mother and two sons.

While she was separated from Sim, Wong met a Japanese engineer named Hiroshi Watanabe, who was a married father of three. After his wife Ayako found out about the affair, Hiroshi wanted to end the affair but Wong was unwilling to. Filled with jealousy, Wong then asked for help from Sim to help her in the murder of Ayako, who came to Singapore a few days ago with their three children to visit her husband.

On 6 January 1970, Wong and Hiroshi shared a dinner at their Everitt Road house. Upon knowing that Hiroshi was working overtime that night, Mimi Wong knew that she could take the chance to execute her plan.

After contacting Sim, Wong and her husband went together to the Jalan Sea View house where the Watanabes were spending the night. Wong brought along a pair of gloves and a knife, while Sim took a tin half-filled with toilet-cleaning liquid, in order to pretend to be a worker coming to repair the house toilet. Using this excuse, the couple managed to let Ayako make them go into the house.

At the same time, the Watanabes' eldest daughter, nine-year-old Chieko Watanabe, was inside her bedroom with her two younger siblings (a boy and a girl), and she could not fall asleep despite having tried her best to do so. Right at this moment, Chieko heard a scream outside the room. Chieko opened her bedroom door to check and see what had happened. The girl saw her mother being attacked by both Sim and Wong inside the toilet, which was right next to the bedroom. Earlier on, after the couple lured Ayako into the toilet, Sim threw some of the toilet cleaning liquid inside the woman's eyes, and covered her mouth (not without getting bitten on the finger) to stop her from shouting. As he restrained the victim, Wong used the knife to stab at Ayako. Seeing this, Chieko screamed out of shock and cried, which attracted the attention of both Wong and Sim. Quickly, Wong went to cover the little girl's mouth. The girl stopped crying and quickly rushed into her room to wake her brother and sister up. After which, Chieko ran out and get to her mother, who was mortally wounded and lost too much blood. The 33-year-old died shortly after she staggered towards her eldest daughter. By then, Wong and Sim were also seen running out of the house and escaped to different locations in Singapore to escape possible retribution from the authorities.

Hiroshi Watanabe returned later that night. He was shocked to see his three children crying over the corpse of his deceased wife, which also sparked grief to the 37-year-old mechanical engineer. Hiroshi then asked his eldest daughter what happened, and Chieko told him that she saw Wong and a man she did not know attacking her mother. Police were contacted and police officer Tan Kim Hai headed the investigations. The investigations led to the police arresting both Wong and Sim the next day. Wong and Sim were both identified out of an identification parade by Chieko, who would become the prosecution's key witness against the couple in their trial. Wong and Sim were charged with Ayako's murder.

Meanwhile, the corpse of Ayako was taken to the mortuary, where forensic pathologist Chao Tzee Cheng examined the body. Professor Chao found two knife wounds on Ayako Watanabe's neck, and one to her abdomen, along with a few others. There were two fatal wounds that caused the woman's death – one to the neck and one to the abdomen. Chao also made a certified finding that the woman died around five to six minutes after the fatal wounds were inflicted on her, which cut through the major blood vessels and caused her to die. Professor Chao was also certain that these wounds were not self-inflicted by Ayako in the form of suicide, given that she was not a left-hander and these wounds were mainly located on the right side, making it hard for her to stab herself with the left hand. He was also certain that there were other people in the toilet where they died, thus fitting the notion that Wong and Sim had done the killing together.

== Trial ==
In November 1970, the trial of Mimi Wong and Sim Woh Kum began to take place.

At the trial, both Wong and Sim accused each other of masterminding the murder. Wong accused her husband for being the sole person who killed Ayako; she said that when she was fighting in the toilet with Ayako, Sim separated them both, and he stabbed the victim when she left the bathroom. Aside from this, she even put up a defence of diminished responsibility, stating that she was intoxicated with alcohol at the time of the crime. Additionally, Wong's psychiatrist, Dr Wong Yip Chong (unrelated to Mimi Wong), also claimed that she had caught the Japanese encephalitis virus from Hiroshi and thus suffered from a viral brain infection at the time of the killing, which impaired her mental responsibility. However, the prosecution psychiatrist stated that Wong was of sound mind when she killed Ayako.

On the other hand, while Sim initially confessed to the police that he indeed helped his wife to kill the victim, he denied helping to kill and instead stated that he tried to stop the two women from fighting, and because he was using his hands to separate the two women, he got bitten on his right hand by Ayako, who was being stabbed by Wong during the scuffle. A psychiatrist was also called to testify about Sim's character, saying that he was a well-mannered and also a simple, naive individual. Sim even accused Wong of being a gang member of the "Red Butterfly" gang, which consisted of female triad members.

After a trial lasting 26 days, on 7 December 1970, High Court judge Tan Ah Tah pronounced the verdict in court. Wong and Sim were found guilty of murder and sentenced to death for murdering Ayako Watanabe. The two judges, Tan Ah Tah and Choor Singh, found that Wong was indeed in control of her mental faculties and thus was not mentally abnormal at the time of her crime, and had intended to murder Ayako out of jealousy over the possible break-up Hiroshi would initiate with her. As for Sim, the judges felt that he should take full responsibility of committing the murder since he shared the common intention with Wong to do the act, hence they sentenced him to death together with Wong.

Sim subsequently appealed against his sentence. But his two appeals were dismissed by both the Court of Appeal of Singapore and the Privy Council from London, based on the fact that he and Wong indeed shared a common intention to kill Ayako. He also lost his appeal for clemency.

== Execution ==
On 27 July 1973, nearly three years and seven months after murdering Ayako Watanabe, 40-year-old Sim Woh Kum and his wife Mimi Wong, then 34 years old, were both hanged at dawn, with executioner Darshan Singh carrying out the executions. On the same day of the couple's joint executions, another convicted murderer, Osman bin Ali, a gardener who killed a cook and an amah in Leedon Park in November 1970, was executed at around the same time as Wong and Sim's executions.

Sim and Wong were both buried side by side in an unspecified cemetery. Their two sons were taken care of by social welfare organizations, while Sim's mother was cared for in an elderly resident's home, where she lived out her life there.

== Aftermath ==
In the aftermath of the case, both Mimi Wong and Sim Woh Kum were considered to be the first couple to be sentenced to death and executed in Singapore since its independence. Simultaneously, Wong was also the first woman to be subjected to capital punishment in Singapore since its independence from both British colonial rule and Malaysia. Her case gained notoriety since its occurrence, and it was considered to be one of the most shocking murder cases which Singapore had faced in its years as an independent nation. In July 2015, more than 45 years after the murder of Ayako Watanabe, Singapore's national daily newspaper The Straits Times published an e-book titled Guilty As Charged: 25 Crimes That Have Shaken Singapore Since 1965, which included the case of Mimi Wong as one of the top 25 crimes that shocked the nation since its independence in 1965. The book was borne out of collaboration between the Singapore Police Force and the newspaper itself. The e-book was edited by ST News Associate editor Abdul Hafiz bin Abdul Samad. The paperback edition of the book was published and first hit bookshelves in June 2017. The paperback edition first entered the ST bestseller list on 8 August 2017, a month after publication.

Singaporean crime show Crimes and Tribulations, a 1997 Chinese-language crime show, was the first television series to re-enact the case of Mimi Wong, and the re-enactment aired as the fourth episode of the show in 1997. Singaporean crime show True Files re-enacted the trial of both Sim Woh Kum and Mimi Wong, and the re-enactment first aired as the second episode of the show's first season on 30 April 2002. The episode is currently viewable via meWATCH (previously known as Toggle) since 5 February 2016. Wong was portrayed by Singaporean actress Eve Ooi, while Sim was portrayed by Singaporean actor Tommy Tan. The case was also re-enacted in crime show Whispers of the Dead, which also re-enact the notable cases solved by forensic pathologist Chao Tzee Cheng; the episode was aired in 2014 as the second episode of the show's first season. In this re-enactment, the identities of the people involved were changed to protect their identities. For example, Wong was renamed as Suzie Tay, while Sim was renamed as Lau Teck Seng, and the victim Ayako Watanabe was renamed as Aika Nakamura in this re-enactment.

== See also ==
- Capital punishment in Singapore
- List of major crimes in Singapore
