= Mandai burnt car murder =

1992 murder of a loan shark by two men in Singapore

- Tan Heng Hong, the murder victim
- Date: 29 – 30 November 1992
- Location: Mandai, Singapore
- Outcome: Maniam found guilty of murder and sentenced to death in 1993; Asokan found guilty of murder and sentenced to death in 1995; Maniam and Asokan executed by hanging at Changi Prison in 1995
- Deaths: Tan Heng Hong (32)
- Injuries: None
- Convicted: Maniam Rathinswamy (25); S. S. Asokan (30)
- Verdict: Guilty
- Convictions: Murder
- Sentence: Death

On 30 November 1992, 32-year-old Tan Heng Hong (Chinese: 陈庆宏; pinyin: Chén Qìnghóng; Pe̍h-ōe-jī: Tân Khèng-hông), a Singaporean odd-job labourer and loan shark, was murdered by two security guards, S. S. Asokan and Maniam Rathinswamy, who lured him to a room at Tan Tock Seng Hospital under the pretext of offering to sell gold. After he was slashed to death with an axe and a knife, Tan's corpse was left inside his car and both Maniam and Asokan drove the car to Mandai, where they set the car alight to cover up the murder. The burnt car and Tan's charred remains were eventually discovered, leading the police to investigate Tan's death. Asokan and Maniam were both arrested more than a month later in Malaysia and Singapore respectively. They were both found guilty of murder, and they were executed on 8 September 1995.

== Death of Tan Heng Hong ==
On 30 November 1992, a farmer discovered a burnt car with human remains (whose gender was unidentifiable) and a charred head of an axe inside a forested area at Mandai. The police investigated and established it as a case of murder. Incidentally, in April that same year, there had been a separate case of another burnt car with human remains along a dirt track off Mandai Road.

The victim was later identified as 32-year-old Tan Heng Hong (alias Ah Hong), an odd-job labourer who engaged in illegal moneylending. Due to the extent that the body had been burnt, it took over a month for him to be definitively identified. The car inside which Tan's body was discovered was purchased under the name of one of Tan's four brothers, despite it being Tan's vehicle. Tan's widowed father was a fish seller and Tan himself was the third of five sons and lived alone in a rental flat. He was reported missing for three days at the time his body was found and his death discovered. According to Tan's father, Tan was last seen alive on 29 November 1992, when he came to pay respects to his deceased mother.

It was established that Tan died either on the night of 29 November 1992 or the early morning of 30 November 1992. Professor Chao Tzee Cheng, a forensic pathologist, examined the body and found that there was little soot particles in the throat and lungs, and concluded that the victim did not die in the fire. He determined that the cause of death was a cut artery in the victim's neck, based on blood splatters found at the printing room of Tan Tock Seng Hospital, where Tan was last seen alive with two Indian men for a business matter. The injury to the neck, according to Professor Chao, caused excessive bleeding that led to Tan's death.

== Arrests and indictments ==
On 8 January 1993, 37 days after the murder, it was reported that two suspects were arrested for committing Tan's murder. One of them, a 30-year-old security guard named S. S. Asokan, a Singaporean citizen, was first caught in Malaysia because of a robbery case in Johor, and he was wanted by the Royal Malaysia Police for three robberies that happened in Johor in 1989. Upon his arrest on 29 December 1992, Asokan confessed to the murder and implicated another man, his long-time friend Maniam Rathinswamy (whom Asokan first befriended in 1980), a security supervisor, as his accomplice in the murder.

Upon Asokan's confession, 25-year-old Maniam, also a Singaporean, was arrested in Singapore on 6 January 1993 and charged with murder two days later; the axe discovered inside the car was also proven to be purchased by Maniam prior to the murder. Asokan, on the other hand, was detained in Malaysia for trial on robbery, which would take place before he could return to Singapore to face a murder charge regarding Tan's death. It was further revealed that both Tan and Asokan were childhood friends who first met each other when Asokan was seven years old.

== Trial of Maniam Rathinswamy ==
Maniam Rathinswamy

On 29 November 1993, 26-year-old Maniam s/o Rathinswamy stood trial for the murder of Tan Heng Hong. Maniam was represented by leading criminal lawyer Subhas Anandan, who would become notable eight years later for representing notorious wife killer Anthony Ler in 2001. Ong Hian Sun and Shanti Abdul Ghani were the prosecutors in charge of Maniam's trial.

Maniam, in his account to the court, stated that he was not the one who killed Tan despite owning the axe. He stated that Asokan was the one who raised the axe to hack at Tan's neck. He recounted that he and Asokan invited Tan to the printing room to have a peaceful talk about a deal to sell some gold to Tan, but the deal fell through as Tan did not comply to Asokan's demands to pay him his commission for some items which Asokan sold to Tan as his middleman. During the argument, Asokan picked up the axe to hack at Tan thrice, which frightened Maniam, who was forced to use a knife to stab Tan on the stomach due to Asokan's threats. Maniam said it was Asokan's idea to burn the body after they both did everything they could to hide Tan's corpse, so as to avoid retribution from the authorities. They even stole some of Tan's jewellery and watch before burning his corpse.

Anandan submitted to the court that Maniam, whom he argued was not involved in the murder, should not be regarded as one who shared the common intention with Asokan to kill Tan, given that there was no premeditation to cause Tan to die and it resulted from a conflict. He argued that the slash wounds inflicted by Asokan were responsible for causing Tan's death. However, the prosecution argued that there was circumstantial evidence that suggested both Maniam and Asokan had willingly acted with the common intention to perpertuate Tan's killing and the intention was evident from Maniam's assistance of Asokan's actions before, during and after Tan's death.

On 3 December 1993, Maniam, whose defence was rejected, was convicted of murder and sentenced to death by the trial judge T. S. Sinnathuray, who formerly heard the case of child killer Adrian Lim (executed in 1988). Subsequently, Maniam's appeal against his conviction was rejected on 16 March 1994.

== Trial of S. S. Asokan ==
S. S. Asokan

While Maniam Rathinswamy remained incarcerated on death row at Changi Prison for Tan Heng Hong's murder, S. S. Asokan remained in Malaysia, where he was tried and sentenced to prison for robbery. After he eventually finished serving his sentence, Asokan was released and extradited to Singapore on 13 August 1994, and faced a murder charge for fatally slashing Tan with an axe.

Asokan stood trial on 10 January 1995, and while testifying in court, he gave a different account than Maniam, which provided more details from his perspective regarding the case. Asokan told the court that Maniam was the one who brought the axe and knife to the printing room at Tan Tock Seng Hospital. Asokan was disappointed with Tan not paying his commission for the pens and lighters Asokan helped Tan sell. This led to the men's plan to lure Tan to the hospital and use the weapons to threaten Tan if he refused to comply and pay the commission; they invited him under the pretext of wanting to sell gold.

Asokan said that Tan did not comply, and both he and Maniam argued with one another. Maniam signalled to Asokan to grab the axe and hack at Tan's throat, which Asokan obeyed. Asokan hit Tan with the axe two more times before Maniam proceeded to stab the man with the knife. The men then disposed of Tan's corpse and burned his car with the body inside. Asokan's defence was that the weapons were intended to threaten Tan to pay up the undischarged commission and that he only followed Maniam's order to hit Tan with the axe.

On 19 January 1995, Asokan was found guilty of murder and sentenced to death by Justice Lai Kew Chai (another source claimed it was High Court judge S. Rajendran who convicted Asokan and imposed the death penalty). Asokan's appeal was rejected on 17 April 1995, after he failed to substantiate his defence of having no common intention with Maniam to kill Tan or intent to cause the fatal injury.

== Executions ==
On the morning of 8 September 1995, both Asokan and Maniam were hanged at Changi Prison.

== Aftermath ==
In the aftermath, Singapore crime series Crimewatch re-enacted the case of Tan's murder in the tenth episode of the show's annual season in 1995. The case went on to become one of the cases notably solved by senior forensic pathologist Chao Tzee Cheng, and in 2014, it was dramatized in Whispers of the Dead, a Singapore crime show which covers the former cases taken by Professor Chao. In the 2014 re-enactment, the killers and victim had their names changed to protect their identities - Maniam was renamed as Gopal Ramasamy, Asokan was renamed as Vijayan and the murdered man Tan Heng Hong was renamed as Ghim See.

In 2013, crime show In Cold Blood re-enacted the case in the ninth episode of the show's third season.

== See also ==
- List of major crimes in Singapore
- Capital punishment in Singapore
