= Asoka de Silva =

Asoka de Silva may refer to:

- Asoka de Silva (admiral) (1931–2006), Sri Lankan Navy officer
- Asoka de Silva (cricketer) (born 1956), Sri Lankan cricket umpire and former player
- Asoka de Silva (judge) (born 1946), Sri Lankan Chief Justice
