= Ashok Upadhyay =

Indian cricketer (born 1953)

Ashok Upadhyay (born 30 October 1953 in Dongapur, India) is a former Indian cricketer who played 6 first-class matches for Vidarbha cricket team from 1972/73 to 1976/77.

Primarily, a slow left-arm orthodox bowler who was a tail-end batsman. He took 13 wickets in 6 first-class matches at an average of 38.61 and scored 49 runs in 11 innings that he batted.

Currently, he is manager of Vidarbha cricket team.
