= Choor Singh =

Singaporean judge and philanthropist

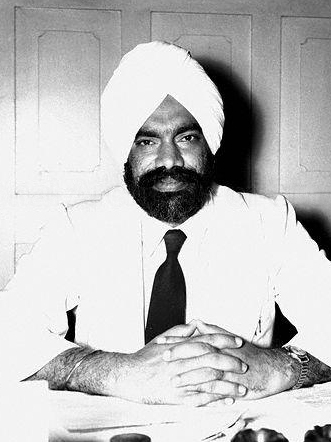
- Singh in 1953

Judge of the Supreme Court of Singapore
- In office 28 August 1963 – 30 November 1980

Personal details
- Born: Choor Singh Sidhu; 19 January 1911 Kotteh, Punjab, British India
- Died: 31 March 2009 (aged 98) Singapore
- Education: University of London
- Committees: Co-founder, patron and honorary chairman, board of trustees, Singapore Khalsa Association

Choor Singh Sidhu (19 January 1911 – 31 March 2009), known professionally as Choor Singh, was a Singaporean lawyer who served as a judge of the Supreme Court of Singapore and, particularly after his retirement from the bench, a philanthropist and writer of books about Sikhism. Born to a family of modest means in Punjab, India, he came to Singapore at four years of age. He completed his secondary education in the top class at Raffles Institution in 1929, then worked as a clerk in a law firm before becoming a civil servant in the Official Assignee's office.

Encouraged by the Assistant Official Assignee, James Walter Davy Ambrose (who was later appointed a High Court Judge), to study law, Choor Singh enrolled as an external student at the University of London, passing the matriculation examination and intermediate LL.B. examination. In 1948 he was appointed a coroner, and the following year was elevated to the post of magistrate, becoming the first Indian to hold such a position in colonial Malaya. Following law studies at Gray's Inn on a government scholarship, he became a Barrister-at-Law in 1955. He was appointed a district judge in 1960 and a judge of the Supreme Court in 1963. Especially noted for his criminal judgments, Singh was the first Singapore judge to impose the death penalty on a woman.

Following his retirement in 1980, Choor Singh continued his close involvement in Indian and Sikh affairs. One of the young Sikhs who founded the Singapore Khalsa Association in 1931, he served as its patron and honorary chairman of its board of trustees. He also contributed to educational charities and causes, both Sikh and non-Sikh, and wrote several books on Sikhism. In 1994, the Sikh community bestowed on him its highest honour by inviting him to lay the foundation stone for the new Gurdwara Sahib building at the Gurdwara Khalsa Dharmak Sabha at 18 Niven Road.

== Early life and education ==
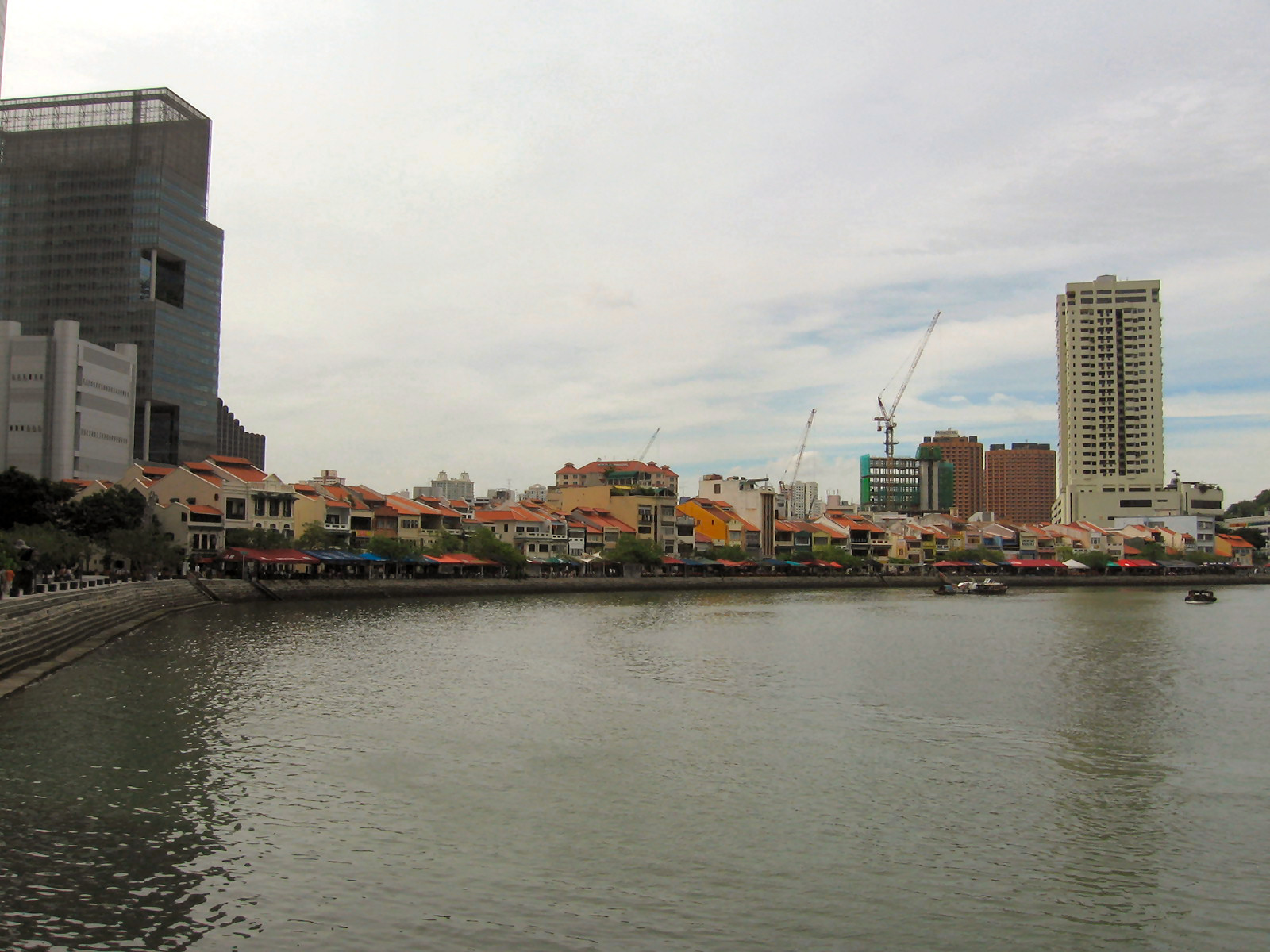
Boat Quay along the Singapore River, where Choor Singh's father worked as a night watchman in a nearby godown, photographed on 3 December 2005

Choor Singh was born in Kotteh, Punjab, India, on 19 January 1911. He came to Singapore at the age of four years with his mother and sister to join his father, who was already employed there as a night watchman in a godown near Boat Quay by the Singapore River. He attended Pearl's Hill Primary School and Outram Road School, at various stages walking 5 kilometres (3 mi) to school, sleeping along a five-foot way, bathing at a roadside pump and studying at night under a street lamp. He completed his secondary education and took the Senior Cambridge examination at Raffles Institution in the top class in 1929. There, he was a classmate of David Marshall, the first Chief Minister of Singapore; they became good friends.

== Career ==
Initially unemployed between 1930 and 1934 due to the Great Depression, he subsequently worked for three years as a clerk in the law firm of Mallal & Namazie for a monthly salary of 20 Straits dollars. Thereafter, he joined the Government Clerical Services for 60 Straits dollars a month and was posted to the Official Assignee's office, which was in charge of administering the estates of bankrupt persons.

The Assistant Official Assignee, James Walter Davy Ambrose (later a High Court Judge), advised Choor Singh to study law. Singh read law books in his leisure time and began saving money to study law in England. This proved to be unnecessary; following a change in the rules, he was able to enrol as an external student at the University of London and passed the matriculation examination and, in 1948, the intermediate LL.B. examination. However, he could not be called to the Bar as a barrister as he did not have time to keep the required dining terms. On 20 May 1948, he was appointed a coroner. In December 1949, Singh was elevated to the post of magistrate, becoming the first Indian to hold such a position in colonial Malaya. He continued his law studies at Gray's Inn, and in 1953 was granted leave on a government scholarship to dine at Gray's Inn. After making four trips in two years, he became a Barrister-at-Law in 1955. In 1958, he was appointed a member of the Appeal Tribunal under the Preservation of Public Security Ordinance.

Choor Singh was one of the founding members of the Sri Guru Nanak Sat Sang Sabha (the Congregation of Sri Guru Nanak's Company), registered on 26 June 1953. The Gurdwara Sri Guru Nanak Satsang Sabha in Katong was built for this congregation in 1969.

=== Judicial career ===
On 11 July 1960, Choor Singh became a district judge. In that year, he also published a book called Gaming in Malaya on the Common Gaming Houses Ordinances of the Federation of Malaya and Singapore. On 28 August 1963, he was appointed a judge of the Supreme Court.

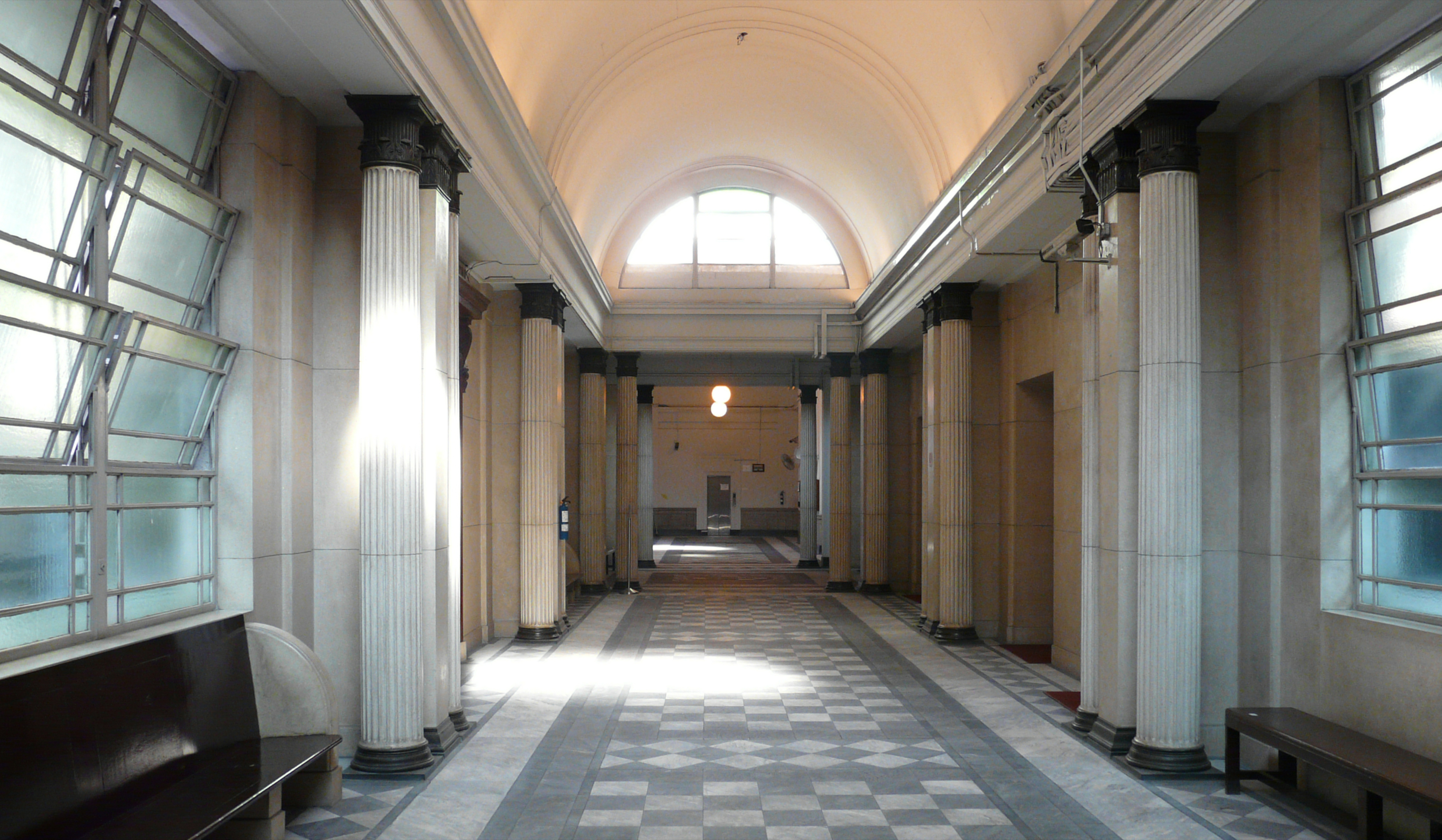
A hallway of the Old Supreme Court Building where Choor Singh worked, photographed on 29 July 2008

During Singh's 17-year career on the bench, 105 of his judgments were reported in the law reports. Particularly noted for his criminal judgments, he was known as "the Hanging Judge" for handing down a large number of capital sentences. He was the first judge in Singapore to impose the death penalty on a woman, Mimi Wong, a cabaret singer who murdered her Japanese lover's wife in 1970. Her husband Sim Woh Kum was also executed for helping Wong to kill the woman. In a 1996 interview with The Straits Times, he said: "I'm satisfied that I've made no mistake and that I've done my duty according to the law." All the five judgments he wrote as a member of the Court of Criminal Appeal were upheld by the Privy Council, then Singapore's highest appellate court. Other cases like the Gold Bars triple murders, the Lee Kim Lai murder case and Pulau Ubin murder were also heard by Singh, who, in all three cases, also found the defendants guilty and sentenced them to death. Aside from this, Singh also heard the 1975 case of Sim Joo Keow, who was convicted of the manslaughter and dismemberment of her sister-in-law over a money matter, and sentenced her to ten years in jail.

In an oral history interview, Singh said that one of the murder trials that he had presided over, the "Body in the Box" case, led to the abolition of jury trials in Singapore criminal cases. Following the trial of a young man, Freddy Tan, for the murder of his friend whose decomposed body was found stuffed into a box, Singh agreed with the jury to convict Tan of culpable homicide not amounting to murder and sentence him to life imprisonment. However, he later learnt that in the jury room a bullying Dutch juror had wanted to impose the death penalty, but because the other jurors disliked his attitude they voted to impose a lower verdict on Tan. The father of the deceased felt an injustice had been done and went to see the Prime Minister, Lee Kuan Yew. Lee then sent for Singh, and Singh informed him of what had happened with the jurors. Lee asked Singh, "Well what do you think. Shall I abolish the jury?" Singh replied that if he had tried Tan without a jury, he would have convicted him of murder without hesitation. Following a public inquiry, jury trials were abolished for all criminal cases in 1969.

Between 1967 and 1979, Singh was also Commissioner of the Land Acquisition Appeals Board. In 1972, in the case of Gian Singh & Co. Ltd. v. Banque de L'Indochine, Singh wrote a dissenting opinion – uncommon in Singapore – when sitting in the Court of Appeal with Chief Justice Wee Chong Jin and Justice Tan Ah Tah. An honorary member of the Law Society of Singapore, he retired as a judge on 30 November 1980.

=== Later years ===
Impatient with nothing to do following his retirement, for about four and a half years from 1981 Choor Singh acted as a personal consultant for Tan Chin Tuan, the Chairman of the Oversea-Chinese Banking Corporation (OCBC), and other companies in the OCBC group such as Great Eastern Life and Overseas Assurance Corporation. For many years, Singh was chairman of both the Probation Committee which supervises the work of probation officers, and the Detention Board, and vice-president of the National Kidney Foundation Singapore. He was also a member of the Presidential Council for Minority Rights and the Disciplinary Committee for advocates and solicitors.

Choor Singh participated as the chairman of a disciplinary committee set up to investigate complaints against a lawyer named Kalpanath Singh in 1989. After making a report at the end of proceedings where cause of sufficient gravity for disciplinary action against Kalpanath Singh was found, Choor Singh was made the respondent to a motion for an order of certiorari filed by Kalpanath Singh in the High Court, where serious allegations that Choor Singh had shown bias against him in that he had:

- threatened or warned a material witness before that witness had given evidence;
- He had indicated he had made his mind up about the veracity of the witness before that witness had given evidence, and before submissions had been made by counsel on behalf of the applicant at the hearing by the disciplinary committee; and
- questioned a material witness about his veracity and motives as a witness other than during the hearing and in the presence of the applicant and his counsel.

It was found that Choor Singh had two private contacts with a material witness in the course of the disciplinary proceedings, even though it is a well-established rule that a decision-maker should not have contact with any party to the proceedings or any of his witnesses in the absence of the other party or his counsel. The High Court found that there was no actual bias, but there was evidence on which reasonable people might believe that Choor Singh might or could not bring an unprejudiced mind to the disciplinary inquiry. The key finding was that the two private contacts with the material witness gave an appearance of a real likelihood of bias. On this basis, the High Court gave the order and quashed the finding of the disciplinary committee. The case was reported as Re Singh Kalpanath (1992).

== Personal life ==
A keen cricketer when younger, Singh learned to play golf and took up gardening. He also continued his close involvement with Indian and Sikh affairs. One of the young Sikhs who founded the Singapore Khalsa Association in 1931, and having been its president in the 1960s, he served as its patron and honorary chairman of the board of trustees. He was also a patron of the Singapore Indian Association and a trustee of the Sikh Welfare Council, He also wrote several books on Sikhism, including Bhai Maharaj Singh: Saint-soldier of the Sikh Faith (1991; later edition, 1999), The Sikh Gurus (1991), Understanding Sikhism (1994; later edition, 2001) and Who is a Sikh? (2004). Associate Professor Dr. Kirpal Singh, a writer and literary editor with the Singapore Management University, penned in the foreword to the 2001 edition of Understanding Sikhism that Singh had managed "to 'engage' the reader through the strategy of writing simply, honestly and without any pretense".

Placing great importance on learning, Singh contributed to Sikh educational charities and other educational causes. He was a trustee of the Singapore Sikh Education Foundation that was inaugurated in 1990 to teach Punjabi to children, and a life member of the Singapore Indian Education Trust which provides financial assistance to Singaporean Indians for their education. As Chairman of the Sikh Advisory Board, he persuaded the Government to allow the use of government school buildings for the teaching of the Punjabi language. Classes were conducted by the Sri Guru Nanak Satsang Sabha at two schools on Saturday mornings, and were attended by about 400 Sikh children.

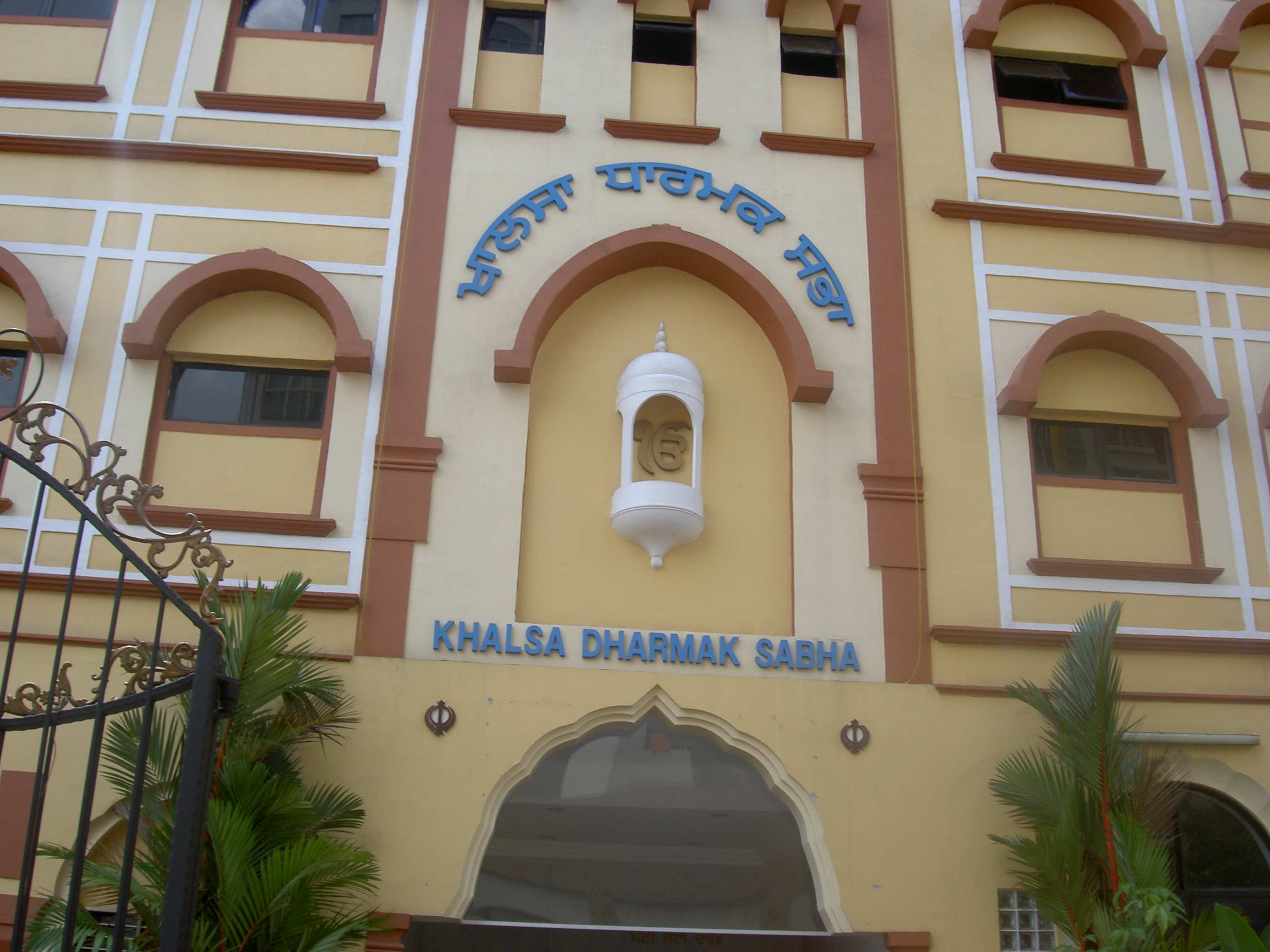
The Gurdwara Khalsa Dharmak Sabha in Rochor, Singapore, the foundation stone of which was laid by Choor Singh in 1994

On 18 January 1999, to celebrate his 88th birthday the next day, Singh donated S$25,000 to the National Institute of Education. About $15,000 was used to establish the Justice Choor Singh Gold Medal, which is awarded to the best student teacher in education studies with a distinction in practicum in the final examination for the Postgraduate Diploma in Education (Primary or Secondary) programme. The remaining $10,000 went towards funding a research project on the Sikh community's contributions to education. In 2001, he donated $140,000 to the Singapore Management University's Centre for Cross-Cultural Studies.

The Sikh community bestowed its highest honour on Singh on 14 August 1994 by inviting him to lay the foundation stone for the new Gurdwara Sahib building at the Gurdwara Khalsa Dharmak Sabha at 18 Niven Road. In August 1996, the Deputy Prime Minister Lee Hsien Loong presented him with one of the inaugural Sikh Community Service Awards awarded by the Singapore Khalsa Association in recognition of his contributions to the community.

For two years before his death, Singh had found it difficult to walk. He died in his bed on 31 March 2009 aged 98. Pre-deceased by his wife, Bhagwan Kaur, in 2004, he left behind two sons, Duleep Singh Sidhu and Dr. Daljeet Singh Sidhu, and a daughter, Manjeet Kaur Sidhu. Choor Singh was cremated at Mandai Crematorium after his funeral on 2 April 2009. The following self-written epitaph was published in his obituary notice in The Straits Times on 1 April 2009:

I came here by His grace

After toiling in many lower lives.
I have done my duty to my State,
To my community and my Faith.
I leave now as ordained by my fate,
To meet Him and sit at His Lotus feet.

== Works ==
- Gaming in Malaya: A Commentary on the Common Gaming Houses Ordinance, 1953, of the Federation of Malaya, and the Common Gaming Houses Ordinance, Cap. 114, of the State of Singapore, Singapore: Malayan Law Journal, 1960, OCLC 207497.
- Bhai Maharaj Singh: Saint-soldier of the Sikh Faith, Singapore: Central Sikh Gurdwara Board, 1991. A later edition was published as Bhai Maharaj Singh: Saint-soldier Martyr of the Sikh Faith, Singapore: Central Sikh Gurdwara Board, 1999, OCLC 226181044.
- The Sikh Gurus, Singapore: Sri Guru Nanak Sat Sang Sabha, 1991, OCLC 226154224.
- Understanding Sikhism: The Gospel of the Gurus, Singapore: Central Sikh Gurdwara Board, 1994, OCLC 226156539. A later edition was published as Sikhs and Sikhisms: Understanding Sikhism (the Gospel of the Gurus): A Precise Account of the Religious History of the Sikhs, their Political Heritage and their Aspirations for the Future, Singapore: Central Sikh Gurdwara Board (reproduced on the website of the Sikh Missionary Society UK), 2001, OCLC 52630397, archived from the original on 29 February 2008.
- Amar Shaheed Sant Jarnail Singh Bhindranwale: Martyr of the Sikh Faith, Harpenden, Hertfordshire: European Institute of Sikh Studies, 1997, OCLC 42716478.
- Memoirs of Mr Justice Choor Singh of The Supreme Court of Singapore, Singapore: [Family of Choor Singh], 2003, OCLC 226062753.
- Who is a Sikh?: And other Essays on Several other Non-Sikh Punjabi Religious Societies other than Hindus and Muslim, Singapore: [Choor Singh Sidhu], 2004, OCLC 308905793.
