= Mathavakannan Kalimuthu =

Convicted murderer in Singapore

Mathavakannan s/o Kalimuthu
- Born: 10 May 1978 (age 48); Singapore
- Other name: K. Mathavakannan
- Status: Released since 28 January 2012
- Conviction: Murder (1 count)
- Penalty: Death sentence by hanging (27 November 1996; commuted by President Ong Teng Cheong on 28 April 1998); Life imprisonment - equivalent to 20 years' jail with remission (imposed by the President's commutation order on 28 April 1998)
- Accomplices: Asogan Ramesh Ramachandren (executed on 29 May 1998 for murder); Selvar Kumar Silvaras (executed on 29 May 1998 for murder)

Details
- Victims: 1 dead (Saravanan Michael Ramalingam)
- Date: 26 May 1996
- Country: Singapore
- Date apprehended: 4 July 1996

Mathavakannan Kalimuthu (Note: His full name was also reported as K. Mathavakannan in some sources) (Tamil language: மாதவக்கண்ணன் காளிமுத்து; born 10 May 1978) is a Singaporean who, together with his two friends, assaulted and murdered a gangster named Saravanan Michael Ramalingam on 26 May 1996. Mathavakannan, who was arrested on 4 July 1996, was tried and convicted of murder by the High Court of Singapore. As murder was a hanging offence in Singapore and since he was 16 days past his 18th birthday when he committed the murder, Mathavakannan was sentenced to suffer the mandatory sentence of death on 27 November of the same year he killed Saravanan. Mathavakannan's two accomplices were also found guilty and sentenced to death in the same trial.

Despite losing his appeal on 14 October 1997, Mathavakannan was granted clemency by President of Singapore Ong Teng Cheong, who commuted his sentence to life imprisonment on 28 April 1998 while his two friends were executed on 29 May 1998 after they failed to obtain clemency from the President. Mathavakannan served a total of 16 years in prison (inclusive of the period he spent in remand and on death row) before he was released on 28 January 2012.

His case had attracted media attention once again on 28 November 2011 when he filed an appeal regarding the issue of his life sentence, whether it should be 20 years' imprisonment (the old definition) or imprisonment for the rest of his natural life (the new definition) in accordance with a landmark appeal by Abdul Nasir bin Amer Hamsah on 20 August 1997, which changed the definition of life imprisonment under the law. The High Court then allowed Mathavakannan's appeal, and he became a free man soon after and has led a low-profile life outside prison since his release.

Mathavakannan is the sixth death row inmate to have received clemency from the President of Singapore since 1965. The rarity of any President in Singapore pardoning a death row inmate from execution in Singapore was another factor that made Mathavakannan's case notable in the city-state and beyond its borders.

== Early life ==
Mathavakannan Kalimuthu was born in Singapore on 10 May 1978. He was the only son of his family and had one younger sister, who is two years younger. He studied in the Institute of Technical Education (ITE) in 1993 before he dropped out of school to support his parents, who both suffered from poor health, and sister, who was a student. His father, Muthusamy Kalimuthu (aged 50 in 1998), worked at the Public Utilities Board and suffered from both epilepsy and an unknown mental illness, requiring long-term treatment at the Institute of Mental Health (IMH). His mother Arumugam Angelay (aged 47 in 1998), suffered from hypertension and diabetes and worked as a junior officer at a production firm with a salary of S$1,100. Mathavakannan worked various jobs to support his family, including as a cleaner at a hotel for eight months, a paint scraper at a aerospace company for one-and-a-half years, and a labourer before his enlistment for National Service.

== Crime and capital punishment ==
=== Murder of Saravanan Michael Ramalingam ===
On 26 May 1996, 16 days after celebrating his 18th birthday, 18-year-old Mathavakannan, together with his two older friends and secret society gang members, 23-year-old odd-job worker Asogan Ramesh Ramachandren (Note: Asogan Ramesh was his given name, while Ramachandren was his patronymic) (Tamil language: அசோகன் ரமேஷ் ராமச்சந்திரன்) and 24-year-old unemployed Selvar Kumar Silvaras (Note: His name was also spelt as Selva Kumar Silvaras in some sources) (Note: Selvar Kumar was his given name, while Silvaras was his patronymic) (Tamil language: செல்வார் குமார் சில்வரஸ்), assaulted and murdered 25-year-old Saravanan Michael Ramalingam (Tamil language: சரவணன் மைக்கேல் ராமலிங்கம்), a secret society gangster from the Sio Ang Koon Secret Society and Lion Brothers. Before that, Saravanan and Asogan had had conflicts with each other on three previous occasions.

According to court documents detailing the case, Mathavakannan had gone drinking with both Selvar and Asogan on the night of 25 May 1996. It was not until the early hours of 26 May 1996 that the trio decided to head home. On the way, the trio encountered Saravanan, who had been a schoolmate and friend of Selvar's at Anderson Secondary School before they fell out due to their rival gang allegiances. Seeing him, Selvar, then a member of the "Tiger Rose" gang, shouted at Saravanan, beckoning him over for a talk. In response, Saravanan allegedly shouted back some Tamil expletives and ran away.

The trio promptly gave chase, with Mathavakannan being the first to catch up with Saravanan at the void deck of Block 93, Whampoa Drive. Saravanan pulled out a knife and slashed Mathavakannan on the hand. As Mathavakannan and Saravanan fought, Asogan arrived and helped Mathavakannan overpower Saravanan. Mathavakannan then took the knife and stabbed Saravanan several times. Soon after, Selvar caught up with his two companions and swung a broken chair at Saravanan, fracturing his skull. Saravanan then died.

=== Capture and sentencing ===
After the murder, Mathavakannan was not arrested until 4 July 1996, when he was just beginning his two-year mandatory National Service. As for Asogan and Selvar, Asogan was arrested in a hotel in Singapore while Selvar gave himself up to the police. Within the next four months, all three were brought to trial before High Court judge Kan Ting Chiu in the High Court of Singapore for murder. As murder was a capital offence in Singapore, a guilty verdict would result in a mandatory death penalty.

On 27 November 1996, six months after the murder of Saravanan, the three men were found guilty of murder and sentenced to death. As Mathavakannan was 16 days past his 18th birthday when he killed Saravanan, his conviction for Saravanan's murder meant that he was automatically sentenced to mandatory execution by hanging under Singapore law. Had Mathavakannan committed the crime more than two weeks (or at least 17 days) earlier, he would have been spared the death sentence and instead would have served indefinite imprisonment at the President's Pleasure.

It was reported that when Justice Kan delivered his verdict, among the 40 people present to hear the sentence, a female relative of one of the three men reacted badly to the death sentence, and her family had to restrain her as she made an emotional scene in court.

== Aftermath ==
=== Appeal ===
After their convictions by the High Court, Mathavakannan, Asogan and Selvar appealed against their sentences. However, nearly a year later, on 14 October 1997, the Court of Appeal of Singapore dismissed the appeals of all the three accused and upheld their death sentences.

After losing their appeals against the death sentence, all three men petitioned to the President of Singapore Ong Teng Cheong for clemency on 13 January 1998. In his clemency petition, Mathavakannan expressed that he felt deep regret for causing the death of Saravanan on that night itself, and claimed that he did not want to fight the man or intend to kill the man when he caught up with Saravanan, who started the fight by inflicting the first blow on him, leading to Mathavakannan having to defend himself.

Mathavakannan's lawyer Subhas Anandan also wrote in the clemency letter and asked for mercy to the President on account of Mathavakannan's young age at the time of the murder, and that he played the most minor role out of all the three in the murder of Saravanan. Anandan's involvement in the clemency letter was referred to when he explained the presidential clemency process in Singapore during an interview in 2013. Mathavakannan was not explicitly referred to during the interview.

Not only that, Mathavakannan's mother also submitted a personal letter to President Ong pleading for mercy from the President. In the letter, Mathavakannan's mother said these words:

My son is my world, my life and the very essence of my existence... If the death sentence is carried out, it would also be my death sentence because the sorrow of the loss of my only son would surely kill me.

There were a total of five letters submitted on behalf of Mathavakannan to appeal for mercy from President Ong.

=== Clemency granted and commutation of sentence ===
On 28 April 1998, three months and two weeks after receiving Mathavakannan's clemency plea, President Ong decided to, on the advice of the Cabinet, accept Mathavakannan's submission and thus commuted 19-year-old Mathavakannan's death sentence to life imprisonment. The reasons behind Mathavakannan's successful clemency petition were not given.

Extracted from President Ong's commutation order (republished in Mathavakannan s/o Kalimuthu v Attorney-General [2012] SGHC 39):

WHEREAS Mathavakannan K, having been tried at the High Court, Singapore, was on the 27 November 1996, in due form of law convicted of and sentenced to death for the commission of an offence of murder:

AND WHEREAS I have, upon the advice of the Cabinet, decided in the exercise of my prerogative that the said sentence of death passed upon him be commuted to a sentence of life imprisonment:

NOW, THEREFORE, I, ONG TENG CHEONG, President of the Republic of Singapore, in exercise of the powers conferred on me by section 238 of the Criminal Procedure Code, do hereby commute the said sentence of death and order that the said Mathavakannan K be imprisoned for life.

GIVEN under my Hand and the Seal at the Istana, Singapore, this 28th day of April 1998.

At the time of his pardon from the gallows, Mathavakannan was the sixth person since 1965 to be granted clemency from the President of Singapore. There were five precedent cases of death row inmates (including drug trafficker Sim Ah Cheoh) who had successfully obtained clemency petitions from the President before him. This outcome was widely reported at that time as the successful cases of clemency were considered a rare phenomenon in Singapore, since there were many people who failed to receive pardon from the President of Singapore. This was the only clemency granted by President Ong during his term of presidency.

=== May 1998 executions of Asogan and Selvar ===
As for both Asogan and Selvar's clemency petitions, President Ong, who also received them besides Mathavakannan's, decided to reject both the clemency letters on the advice of the Cabinet. Soon after, two death warrants were issued for both Asogan and Selvar, who were scheduled to be hanged in Changi Prison at dawn on 29 May 1998, according to a 1998 Amnesty International Report.

Amnesty International, upon hearing that both Asogan and Selvar will be executed, called upon Singapore to cancel the executions and to abolish the death penalty in Singapore. They also welcomed President Ong's decision to spare Mathavakannan's life and used this fact to urge the President to also extend his mercy to the other two accomplices and spare their lives as well. While they do concede that both Asogan and Selvar deserved to be punished for Saravanan's murder, they said that the death penalty violated the rights to live and was not an effective deterrent to crime.

Despite Amnesty International's plea for clemency, both Asogan and Selvar were hanged at dawn on 29 May 1998, as scheduled in their death warrants. They were executed together with an unnamed drug trafficker on the same day. The pair's obituaries were published a day after their executions in the national daily newspaper The Straits Times. The pair's hangings were also confirmed by Amnesty International in its 1998 execution report and 1999 annual human rights report. The 1999 human rights report also revealed that within the year 1998, there were at least a total of 28 executions reportedly carried out in Singapore (mostly for drug trafficking) and at least five death sentences being reportedly meted out by the courts of Singapore for murder or drug trafficking, but Amnesty International believed that the actual numbers could be higher.

The executions of both Asogan and Selvar took place just three days after 26 May 1998, the date of the murdered victim Saravanan's second death anniversary.

== Life imprisonment ==
After his successful clemency outcome, Mathavakannan was removed from death row and he began to serve his life sentence since the date he was pardoned. Although the Singapore Prison Service (SPS) claimed on 15 November 1999 that Mathavakannan was serving life imprisonment since 4 July 1996 (the date of his arrest), it was subsequently confirmed that Mathavakannan's sentence was to take effect from the date he was pardoned by President Ong.

Before 21 August 1997, life imprisonment means a fixed prison term of 20 years, and with good behaviour, an early release would be granted after serving at least two-thirds of the life sentence (13 years and 4 months). On 20 August 1997, due to the appeal of Abdul Nasir bin Amer Hamsah, who was serving 18 years' imprisonment and a consecutive life sentence (in total 38 years' imprisonment) with caning for robbery with hurt resulting in death and kidnapping, the Court of Appeal, which dismissed Abdul Nasir's appeal for a concurrent aggregate sentence, decided to amend the interpretation of life imprisonment as a term of incarceration for the rest of the convicted prisoner's natural life instead of 20 years in prison, and the new interpretation will apply to future crimes committed after 20 August 1997. The appeal of Abdul Nasir, titled "Abdul Nasir bin Amer Hamsah v Public Prosecutor [1997] SGCA 38", was since regarded as a landmark in Singapore's legal history as it changed the definition of life imprisonment from "life" to "natural life" under the law.

In accordance to the appeal ruling of Abdul Nasir's case, since Mathavakannan had murdered Saravanan on 26 May 1996, 1 year and 3 months before 20 August 1997, his life sentence was considered as a 20-year jail term and his tentative date of release, if served with good behaviour, was to be on 28 August 2011, according to the SPS on 14 November 2002.

On 13 September and 18 December 2006, there were two letters were written to SPS by Mathavakannan's lawyers requesting for the clarification of Mathavakannan's release date. On 28 December, SPS replied that the President Ong (who died 4 years earlier in 2002) had commuted Mathavakannan's death sentence to "natural life imprisonment", in accordance to the appeal outcome of Abdul Nasir in 20 August 1997. As Mathavakannan's clemency was granted in April 1998, eight months after the appeal, SPS had considered Mathavakannan's life sentence as natural life imprisonment.

On 4 January 2007, Mathavakannan's lawyers once again sought clarification from SPS via another letter. The SPS replied that they need more time to confirm the date. On 5 March 2007, SPS stated in a reply letter that upon clarification with the Attorney-General's Chambers (AGC), the commutation of Mathavakannan's death sentence "by the President to life imprisonment should be construed as life imprisonment for his remaining natural life".

On 26 October 2010, Mathavakannan's mother sent a letter to the Minister of Law regarding her son's sentence. In December 2010, the SPS once again reiterated in a reply that Mathavakannan's life sentence was to be natural life imprisonment in accordance to the new interpretation set by Abdul Nasir's case on 20 August 1997.

On 28 March 2011, in response to another letter by Mathavakannan's lawyers, the AGC rejected the motion to restate his case on 28 July 2011, and stated that Mathavakannan would have his case assigned to the Life Imprisonment Review Board to assess his suitability for release on parole, which would take place from 28 April 2018 onwards should Mathvakannan's sentence was actually natural life imprisonment and once he served at least 20 years of his natural life sentence.

== Second appeal and release ==
=== Appeal ===
Mathavakannan filed a new appeal, through his original lawyer Subhas Anandan, and another lawyer Sunil Sudheesan, regarding the issue of his life sentence, with the Attorney-General of Singapore becoming the defendant of this appeal.

In the appeal, which was heard in the High Court by High Court judge Lee Seiu Kin, Mr Subhas argued that there was no mention of commuted sentences in the ruling when the Court of Appeal changed the interpretation of life imprisonment. Since there was ambiguity, the benefit of the doubt should be given to their client. Mr Subhas said, "Mr Mathavakannan was of the belief and held the legitimate expectation that he had to serve 20 years' imprisonment in total and would potentially qualify for remission after 13 years and four months." He raised the fact that since he committed the offence before 20 August 1997, Mathavakannan's life term should be considered as a 20-year prison term by the Court of Appeal's stand that crimes committed before that date would warrant 20-year-long life sentences for those involved in these crimes. Subhas additionally pointed out that on 14 November 2002, SPS had stated that his client's "tentative date of release is 28 August 2011". It meant that SPS could only have stated this if it was of the opinion that life imprisonment meant 20 years' jail and was subject to remission, meaning that the SPS, having referred to President Ong's commutation order, it formed the view that life imprisonment meant 20 years with remission. This led to Mathavakannan to believe for a period of almost eight years that he only had to serve 20 years' imprisonment with remission.

In response to Subhas Anandan's arguments, the Attorney-General's Chambers, argued that Mathavakannan's life sentence had taken effect on 28 April 1998, the day he received presidential clemency from President Ong. This would mean he was affected by the Court of Appeal ruling over life sentences meted out after 20 August 1997 and hence he must stay in jail for the rest of his natural life, with the possibility of parole once it was confirmed that at least 20 years of the sentence was fully served by the convicted prisoner.

=== Outcome ===
After hearing the arguments from both sides on 28 November 2011, Justice Lee reserved his judgement until 20 January 2012. On 20 January 2012, Justice Lee allowed Mathavakannan's appeal and ordered that Mathavakannan's life term should be considered as 20 years' imprisonment instead of a jail sentence lasting his remainder of his natural lifespan. In his verdict (which was published on 27 February 2012), Justice Lee accepted that the ruling should not apply to Mathavakannan's case mainly because Mathavakannan committed the offence of murder on 26 May 1996, more than a year before 20 August 1997, which meant that his life sentence should not be construed as natural life imprisonment. The appeal ruling had already made it clear that those committed crimes or those pending trials in Singapore before 20 August 1997 would not be affected by the verdict.

Justice Lee also stated that there was ambiguity over President Ong's commutation order regarding what he meant by ordering Mathavakannan be imprisoned for life – whether for 20 years or his natural life; due to this, he rather gave Mathavakannan the benefit of the doubt. He also pointed out that at the time when President Ong commuted Mathavakannan's death sentence, the life imprisonment laws were changed for merely eight months, and the old interpretation of life imprisonment had remained so for more than 40 years before this reform in 1997 and in President Ong's case, the advisers might not have informed him to specifically define the life sentence given to Mathavakannan due to the uncertainty of whether the amended law should apply in his case.

As such, he decided that it would be 20 years in jail for Mathavakannan's case. Additionally, as Mathavakannan had served his sentence with good behaviour since 28 April 1998, he was qualified for one-third remission of his sentence and was set to be released soon.

It was reported that after hearing the decision, Mathavakannan's family members rejoiced over this decision, and they expressed their gratitude to Mathavakannan's lawyer Subhas Anandan, who had been representing him since his murder appeal 14 years ago. Mathavakannan's younger sister said to reporters, "It has been a very long wait."

Some other lawyers also expressed their support to this decision, with one lawyer B J Lean commented, "if there was a commuting from death to life sentence, then the law at that time should be applied." Another lawyer named Amolat Singh - who was not involved in this case - said the judgment illustrates a "cardinal principle in criminal law." He explained that the principle is that "all changes in criminal law imposing liability should apply only to future cases".

The AGC later commented that they would not appeal against Justice Lee's decision.

=== Release ===
Eight days after his successful appeal against his life sentence, and after spending nearly 16 years of his life behind bars, 33-year-old Mathavakannan Kalimuthu was released from jail on 28 January 2012.

== Significance ==
Significantly, in Singapore's legal history, Mathavakannan Kalimuthu was the sixth condemned offender to be granted clemency and for the next 27 years, he remained as the last case of a death row inmate successfully receiving clemency from the President of Singapore, not including the successful clemency pleas of detainees of TPP (who committed capital crimes under the age of 18). Between 1998 and 2025, there were no new cases where the President of Singapore had ever approved clemency for death row inmates pending execution in Singapore, and all of these subsequent petitions were met with failure. These cases include notorious murderers like Anthony Ler (2002), Took Leng How (2006), Leong Siew Chor (2007), Tan Chor Jin (2009), Kho Jabing (Note: The reason behind the two pleas for clemency was even though Kho lost his clemency plea in 2011, but due to the changes of the death penalty laws, Kho's execution was postponed pending this reform, which allowed judges to sentence murderers to life imprisonment in lieu of death provided that the murder is committed with no intention to cause death. Kho was initially re-sentenced to life and caning after being found eligible under the new laws to reduce his sentence (as he intend to rob his victim Cao Ruyin, but unexpectedly killed him during the assault-robbery case), but the highest court of Singapore later sentenced him to death again by a 3-2 decision due to him blatantly disregarding whether his victim would survive the fatal assault and the viciouness of the attack, hence he was sent back to death row again and filed the second plea for clemency, which subsequently failed and led to Kho being executed on 20 May 2016.) (twice in 2011 and 2015 respectively), Micheal Anak Garing (2019), and Iskandar bin Rahmat (2019); and notable drug traffickers like Yong Vui Kong (Note: Despite losing his appeals and clemency plea, Yong Vui Kong would eventually succeed in reducing his death sentence to life imprisonment after Singapore change the laws to remove the death penalty for certain categories of drug couriers, of which Yong was one of them.) (2009), Van Tuong Nguyen (2005) and Iwuchukwu Amara Tochi (2007). Presidents S. R. Nathan, Tony Tan and Halimah Yacob never granted clemency.

27 years after Mathavakannan was spared the gallows, 33-year-old convicted drug trafficker Tristan Tan Yi Rui, who was originally sentenced to death for trafficking not less than 337.6 grams of methamphetamine, successfully had his death sentence commuted to life imprisonment after President Tharman Shanmugaratnam approved his clemency plea.

In some cases involving the imminent execution of some foreigners in Singapore, Mathavakannan's case would be mentioned in midst of the local and international pleas to the Singapore government for clemency to these inmates, with some using his case to urge the government to intervene and show mercy to these people, or mentioning it in some news reports covering the executions of these people. Such people include convicted killers Kho Jabing (Note: It was only in the second clemency plea process and his series of final appeals that attracted the international attention from abolitionists, politicians and organisations, who sought to save his life.) and Took Leng How; (Note: There were around 30,000 people signing the clemency plea asking for Took Leng How's life to be spared before its rejection and Took's subsequent execution on 3 November 2006.) and drug traffickers Prabu Pathmanathan and Prabagaran Srivijayan.

In a newspaper article published on 27 August 2016 (5 days after former President S. R. Nathan died at age 92), which once again brought up Mathavakannan's case, Nathan had once reportedly told a reporter in an interview about Singapore's clemency process that he had to act on the advice of the Cabinet to decide if a person deserves the pardon. He said it was hard when it involves the death sentence and it had to be decided to ensure that justice is served and he cannot go by human emotions to make these decisions and was in no position to contradict the submission when he have not heard the case. Nathan ended the interview by saying, "I have to ask the man up there to forgive me for what is done for the good of society."

== Re-enactment ==
In 1998, Singaporean crime show Crimewatch re-enacted the murder of Saravanan Michael Ramalingam, and it aired as the sixth episode of the show's annual season in August 1998, four months after Mathavakannan was pardoned from death row, and three months after the joint executions of Asogan and Selvar.

The re-enactment misspelled Selvar's full name as Silva Kumar Silvaras. The episode is currently viewable via meWATCH.

== See also ==
- Capital punishment in Singapore
- Life imprisonment in Singapore
- Abdul Nasir bin Amer Hamsah v Public Prosecutor
