= Murder of Packiria Pillai Krishnasamy =

1984 murder of an elderly man in Singapore

Packiria Pillai Krishnasamy
- Packiria Pillai Krishnasamy, the murder victim
- Born: Packiria Pillai Krishnasamy; 1910; Singapore, Straits Settlements
- Died: 27 July 1984 (aged 74); Tah Ching Road, Jurong, Singapore
- Cause of death: Murdered
- Other name: P P Krishnasamy
- Occupation: Provision store owner
- Employer: Himself
- Known for: Murder victim
- Children: 6

On 27 July 1984, 74-year-old Packiria Pillai Krishnasamy was murdered inside his flat at Tah Ching Road, Jurong. The police managed to arrest two suspects, Ramachandran Suppiah and Krishnan Varadan, who were both allegedly responsible for causing Packiria's death during a robbery bid. In May 1987, Ramachandran and Krishnan were both sentenced to hang for murdering Packiria. Although the duo lost their first appeal against the trial verdict, Ramachandran was acquitted after his second appeal, due to insufficient evidence proving that Ramachandran had participated in the crime, and Krishnan however, remained on death row after failing to challenge his conviction a second time. Krishnan was hanged on 15 April 1994 after spending seven years on death row, and he was reportedly the longest-serving death row prisoner in Singapore at the time of his execution.

== Murder and investigations ==
On 27 July 1984, inside a flat at Tah Ching Road, Jurong, 74-year-old Packiria Pillai Krishnasamy, a provision shop owner and father of five children, was found dead by his daughter, who just arrived home at 7.50pm. Packiria, who was resting at home due to a flu before his murder, was survived by his wife, his only son and four daughters. There were at least four stab wounds on Packiria's body: two were on his neck and two were on his chest. The police found that the flat was ransacked, and some money and valuables worth about S$2,000 were missing from the flat, suggesting that the motive was theft or robbery. A bloodstained knife, which resembled a letter-opener, was found at the scene and suspected to be the murder weapon. According to his only son, Packiria was a healthy and friendly man who reportedly wanted to live until the age of 80. Except for his third daughter, Packiria's remaining children were all married and Packiria resided in the flat with his wife and his third daughter.

On 28 August 1984, a month after the murder of Packiria, a suspect was arrested for the crime. The next day, the suspect, a 24-year-old Malaysian odd-job worker named Ramachandran Suppiah, was charged with murder; the police investigations showed that Ramachandran and an unnamed accomplice were allegedly responsible for the murder itself. On 4 January 1986, Ramachandran's accomplice, a 20-year-old unemployed Malaysian named Krishnan Varadan, was arrested and charged two days later with the murder; Krishnan was 18 years old at the time of the alleged offence.

== Murder trial ==
Ramachandran, who told police he was not at the flat when the murder happened.

Krishnan, who admitted to stabbing Packiria to death.

On 27 April 1987, both Ramachandran Suppiah and Krishnan Varadan stood trial at the High Court for murdering Packiria Pillai Krishnasamy back in 1984. The trial was presided by two judges, Judicial Commissioner Chan Sek Keong and Justice Lai Kew Chai, and the prosecution was led by Seng Kwang Boon.

The prosecution's case was that both the defendants shared the common intention to commit theft from Packiria's home, and based on the statements, it was Krishnan who stabbed Packiria five times with a letter-opener and Ramachandran helped restrain the victim during the stabbing. It was further revealed that back in 1981, Krishnan used to work as an assistant at the hawker stall of Packiria's wife for ten months, before he was told to resign after Packiria's wife found his work performance unsatisfactory. Reportedly, in July 1984, Ramachandran and Krishnan visited Packiria's shop and said that Ramachandran's brother wanted to work in Packiria's shop, and they also contacted Packiria's daughter on the eve of the murder that Ramachandran and his brother would visit Packirira's flat but Krishnan would not accompany them. This would be a ruse for both the defendants to enter Packiria's flat to commit robbery and subsequently led to Packiria's death. According to the forensic pathologist Dr Wee Keng Poh, who examined the corpse, he found that one of the stab wounds to Packiria's neck was sufficient in the ordinary course of nature to cause death.

In his statement, Ramachandran stated that he was not at the flat at the time of the murder. He claimed that he was taken to Packiria's HDB block by a "male Indian", referring to Krishnan, who wanted him to commit theft together with him. Ramachandran was waiting outside the lift after Krishnan told him to stay there and he therefore went inside Packiria's flat alone. After a few moments, Krishnan came out with bloodstains on him, and he told Ramachandran he had stabbed Packiria, and both of them went inside to search the flat for the knife, but they could not find the murder weapon. After which, Krishnan told Ramachandran that they had to flee, and Krishnan was seen carrying a plastic bag while telling Ramachandran to escape. In court however, Ramachandran departed from his statement and stated he helped restrain Packiria to help tie up his hands but after he saw Kishnan brandishing a knife, he left the scene out of fear before Krishnan stabbed the 74-year-old victim, and he was unaware all along that Krishnan carried a weapon.

As for Krishnan, he gave statements that he had stabbed Packiria with a letter-opener, and during the stabbing, Ramachandran helped restrain the victim and held on to the hands while Krishnan stabbed him. In court, Krishnan gave his defence and said that he accidentally stabbed the victim on the neck, due to the fact that the victim Packiria struggled and resisted while Krishnan tried to restrain him, and during the struggle, Krishnan stabbed him without noticing, and he left the room after the scuffle between him and Packiria.

On 30 April 1987, Judicial Commissioner Chan Sek Keong and Justice Lai Kew Chai delivered their verdict, with Justice Lai pronouncing the decision in court. In the verdict, Justice Lai stated that the two men shared a common intention to commit theft, and in furtherance of the common intention, Krishnan had stabbed Packiria to death and Ramamchandran had gone to ransack the flat during the stabbing, and it indicated he was not frightened or confused at the sight of the stabbing, but shared the intent to steal from Packiria's flat and consented to the stabbing. Justice Lai noted that the judges found no presence of defensive wounds on Packiria's body and it showed that there was no struggle between Packiria and Krishnan during the stabbing. Hence, both Judicial Commissioner Chan and Justice Lai found Ramachandran and Krishnan guilty of murder, and the two accused were thus sentenced to death, which was the mandatory sentence for murder under Section 302 of the Penal Code.

== First appeal process ==
In April 1989, the appeals of both Krishnan Varadan and Ramachandran Suppiah were heard at the Court of Appeal by three judges: Justice A P Rajah, Justice F A Chua (Frederick Arthur Chua) and Justice T S Sinnathuray. Ramachandran argued that he and Krishnan only planned to commit robbery, and he never knew all along that Krishnan brought along a letter-opener or used it to stab Packiria outside of their plan. Krishnan also insisted that he never intended to cause Packiria's death when he stabbed him during the scuffle between him and the victim.

On 10 January 1991, 21 months after the judgement was reserved, the Court of Appeal made their decision and dismissed the appeal, affirming the findings of the trial court in the cases of Krishnan and Ramachandran.

== Second appeal process ==
=== Motion to re-open appeal ===
On 15 July 1992, both Krishnan and Ramachandran filed a criminal motion to the Court of Appeal and sought to re-open their appeals. Both their lawyers, Peter Fernando (Ramachandran's lawyer) and R Palakrishnan (Krishnan's lawyer), argued that the decision to reject their clients' appeals should be ruled invalid, because one of the judges, A P Rajah, had retired in October 1990 and only signed the judgement three months later in January 1991, and the ruling was delivered by only the remaining two judges T S Sinnathuray and Justice F A Chua during the date of the ruling, which did not amount to a unanimous decision made by the three judges constituted to hear appeals in Singapore.

On 11 August 1992, the Court of Appeal's three judges - Chief Justice Yong Pung How, Justice Goh Joon Seng and Justice Chao Hick Tin - delivered their judgement. They ruled in favour of the two appellants, agreeing with the defence counsels that the dismissal of the appeal with an incomplete appellate court panel was unconstitutional in the case of the two men, and they ordered a re-hearing of the appeal before a new three-judge panel to determine whether the convictions of both Ramachandran and Krishnan should be upheld. It became the first case where the verdict of a concluded appeal was ruled unconstitutional and invalid, and led to the same case being re-heard by the appellate court.

=== Re-hearing of appeal and Ramachandran’s acquittal ===
On 20 October 1992, the Court of Appeal's three-judge panel, consisting of Chief Justice Yong Pung How, Justice S. Rajendran and Justice Warren Khoo, made their final ruling after they re-heard the appeal.

In their judgement, the three-judge panel found that the prosecution had failed to prove beyond a reasonable doubt that Ramamchandran had shared a common intention with Krishnan to commit murder or theft. They accepted the arguments of Ramachandran's lawyer Peter Fernando that Ramachandran should not have been called to give his defence, because there was no direct or circumstantial evidence to link Ramachandran to the murder itself. Therefore, the Court of Appeal acquitted Ramachandran of the murder charge and set aside both his murder conviction and death sentence, and allowed Ramachandran to be released. Aside from Ramachandran's acquittal, the Court of Appeal held that Krishnan was indeed guilty of the charge of murder against him, since Krishnan had admitted to stabbing Packiria to death. Hence, Krishnan became the sole perpetrator of the case to remain on death row for murdering Packiria back in 1984.

The acquittal of Ramachandran made headlines in Singapore, because his case was the first in Singapore where a concluded appeal was re-opened for re-hearing and ended with Ramachandran's acquittal. According to his lawyer Peter Fernando, Ramachandran's whereabouts were unknown shortly after he was released, and the lawyer was unable to locate him. It was also the first case to be heard before the Court of Appeal twice with different judges on both occasions. Due to the unusual nature of the case, there were calls to the legal community for an urgent reform to avoid cases of wrongful convictions due to the possibility of an innocent person being executed due to the execution of one person was irreversible, as well as more caution by the prosecution to pursue a conviction in cases where the possibility of convicting the defendant is unclear.

In the aftermath of Ramachandran's acquittal, his case was once again mentioned in light of the February 1994 landmark ruling of the appeal by Chin Seow Noi and her two accomplices for murdering Chin's female lover, and the appellate court stated in the verdict that it is acceptable to convict a person based on the statements of his co-accused that implicated the person in the crime. Eventually, Chin and her two co-accused (one of them was her younger brother) were all hanged on 31 March 1995 for the killing. Lawyers raised their concern that due to the ruling, there was a risk of a person being wrongfully convicted of a crime based on the statements of a co-accused. Ramachandran's former lawyer Peter Fernando stated that the strongest evidence available to incriminate his former client was merely the statements of Krishnan but no other direct or circumstantial evidence to prove his involvement in the crime, and Fernando stated that should the appellate court made such a ruling before Ramachandran's appeal was re-opened and re-heard, he would have been hanged together with Krishnan for murdering Packiria.

== Fate of Krishnan ==
=== Death row ===
Krishnan Varadan
- Born: Krishnan Varadan c. 1965; Malaysia
- Died: 15 April 1994 (aged 29); Changi Prison, Singapore
- Cause of death: Execution by hanging
- Occupation: Hawker stall assistant (former)
- Parents: Varadan Ramasamy (father); C Hulamba (mother)
- Status: Executed
- Motive: Robbery
- Conviction: Murder (one count)
- Criminal charges: Murder (one count)
- Penalty: Death by hanging

In April 1993, Krishnan's lawyer R Palakrishnan submitted an appeal for clemency, seeking to have Krishnan's death sentence commuted to life imprisonment. During that month itself, Krishnan became the longest-serving prisoner on Singapore's death row (which also held about 70 more people); according to lawyers, a prisoner awaiting the death penalty would spend an average of two years on death row before they were executed.

Some details of Krishnan's life on death row were also reported in The New Paper, which exclusively covered his case. According to Krishnan's 30-year-old brother Thirunakarasu, Krishnan kept a diary during his incarceration at Changi Prison, recording the names and personal particulars of the 48 prisoners he had seen passing by his death row solitary cell to the prison gallows between 10 July 1987 and 30 October 1992; these convicts include infamous child murderer Adrian Lim and his two female accomplices, who were hanged on 25 November 1988, and both Lim Joo Yin and Ronald Tan Chong Ngee, who were hanged on 3 April 1992 for soliciting Sim Ah Cheoh to smuggle drugs in 1985. At that point, Krishnan's mother died the age of 54 in 1990 from cancer while his father suffered from poor health and died in 1991 at the age of 62. Krishnan, the eighth of nine children in his family, would constantly receive visits from his siblings from Kuala Lumpur and Ipoh, and only Thirunakarasu's sister-in-law Mohana, a police constable who lived in Singapore, would visit him most often, and Krishnan would often maintain a cheerful demeanour while trying to hide his sadness to avoid making Mohana said.

Reportedly, aside from reading books, watching television and looking at photos of his family, Krishnan would also chat with his neighbour on death row and regularly made Hindu prayers inside his cell. He fashioned a rosary with 108 beads made of bread crusts and used it to pray, and he would fast every Friday whenever an execution(s) took place, since it was a practice to carry out executions at dawn during Friday mornings. Krishnan also fast for a week whenever the death anniversary of Packiria was around the corner, and also pray for his visitors. Krishnan's brother also told the press that when Krishnan first heard the sounds of the trapdoor opening in the gallows nearby, he was so traumatized and haunted by it that he cannot sleep for days, and he also would see the death row inmates crying, being dragged forcibly or smiling as they walked past his cell, and he also became resigned to the fact that he might meet the same fate as the inmates he saw.

=== Execution ===
On 13 April 1994, it was reported that Krishnan's plea for clemency was rejected by then President Ong Teng Cheong, who, on the advice of the Cabinet, chose to not spare Krishnan from the gallows. He was due to hang at Changi Prison on 15 April 1994 for murdering Packiria Pillai Krishnasamy, nearly ten years after he committed the crime. On the same date of Krishnan's execution, a 40-year-old moneylender named Koh Aik Siew was hanged at Changi Prison for trafficking 680g of heroin. Koh, who committed the offence in 1993, was the 53rd person to be executed under the Misuse of Drugs Act since 1975.

== Fate of Packiria's family ==
Shortly after Krishnan's case made the news in April 1993 (a year before he was hanged), Packiria's family members, who were still saddened over his death, also came forward to give the side of their story. Packiria's only son told The New Paper that his father treated Krishnan like a son, and Packiria would often cook breakfast for Krishnan while he was still working under his mother and lived at his father's flat. Packiria's son stated that being the only son and having married with children himself, he hoped that Krishnan would be taking on the role as a surrogate son and caretaker of his son more during his absence. Packiria's son stated that while he was not harbouring any feelings of vengeance, he was unable to forgive Krishnan, who killed his father even though they treated him like family in the past. Packiria's fourth daughter also stated when she conveyed to her father about Krishnan's intention of introducing Ramachandran's brother to work for her father, she felt guilty as she never knew that this would lead to the death of her father, whom she described as a good man undeserving of such a brutal death.

== See also ==
- Capital punishment in Singapore
- List of major crimes in Singapore
