= Koh Swee Beng case =

1988 case of a man charged with murdering an illegal moneylender

Koh Swee Beng
- 1988 police mugshot of Koh Swee Beng
- Born: Koh Swee Beng; 1966 (age 59–60); Singapore
- Status: Incarcerated in 1988, released since September 2005
- Conviction: Murder (one count)
- Criminal charges: Murder
- Penalty: Death penalty, later commuted to life imprisonment

On 16 February 1988, the eve of Lunar New Year, in Lengkok Bahru, Singapore, 31-year-old Tay Kim Teck (郑金德 Zhèng Jīndé) was attacked by a group of six men. Tay was stabbed in the chest and later died of his injuries. It was revealed that Tay had earlier assaulted a man named Tan Ai Soon, and the group of six attackers, which included Tan's sons, son-in-law and foster son, were seeking to avenge Tan. All six men were initially charged with murder; however the murder charges for five of the men were later reduced to rioting. The murder charge on the sixth attacker, 22-year-old Koh Swee Beng (许瑞明 Xǔ Ruìmíng), remained. Koh was initially sentenced to death and his appeal dismissed; however two days before he was due to be executed, his death sentence was commuted to life imprisonment by President Wee Kim Wee.

== Attack ==
Tan Ai Soon and Tay Kim Teck were part of a group who was gambling in a market in Lengkok Bahru. A dispute occurred between Tan and Tay, which resulted in Tay attacking Tan. Word of the attack spread to Tan's sons Tan Eng Poh, Tan Eng Geok, Tan Eng Chye (or Tan Eng Chai), their brother-in-law Ng Eng Guan, their friend Ong Hong Thor, and foster brother Koh Swee Beng, who came down to the market. Koh also took a knife from a market stall which was closed at the time. Tay was aggressive; even when others told him that Tan's son was looking for him, Tay said that he was not afraid of Tan’s son. Tay took two stools from the market and shouted for Tan's son to come and challenge him while also using vulgarities.

Afterwards, the group of six men appeared and confronted Tay, and Tay attempted to flee. The six men chased him for a distance to an open field before they caught up. Tay fell to the ground and the group started attacking him. Koh, the only member who was armed, took out the knife and stabbed him five times. The group fled afterwards and Tay died within a few minutes.

== Trial ==
Initially, all six attackers were charged with murder. However, after considering the role each attacker had played in the assault, the murder charges against the Tan brothers, Ng and Ong were reduced to rioting. They were later each sentenced to two years' jail and four strokes of the cane. As Koh was the only one who stabbed Tay, he would face the murder charge alone.

On 9 April 1990, Koh Swee Beng stood trial for the murder of Tay Kim Teck. The trial was heard by Judicial Commissioner (JC) Chan Sek Keong and judicial member Tan Teow Yeow. The trial prosecutor was Lee Sing Lit and Koh's defence lawyer was Kelvin Lim.

Professor Chao Tzee Cheng, who examined Tay's body after his death, testified that Tay sustained a total of 16 injuries. Two of these injuries, one stab wound to the front chest and another to the left back chest, were sufficient in the ordinary course of nature to cause death.

The defence argued that Koh had been provoked indirectly by Tay due to his assault on Tan; Koh had lost his self-control upon hearing about Tay's assault, and this was exacerbated by Tay's aggressive attitude and use of vulgarities.

On 20 April 1990, the trial judges found Koh found guilty of murder and sentenced him to the mandatory death penalty. They found that when Koh first heard about the assault on Tan, he had not completely lost his self-control, as was shown in two instances. Firstly, Tay had used vulgarities on Koh, but Koh was still able to tell Tan Eng Geok to snatch the stools which Tay was holding. Secondly, when Koh caught up with Tay after chasing him with the group, Tay was already on the ground blocking attacks from the other five men; yet Koh still chose to stab Tay without any sudden provocation by Tay.

Koh subsequently appealed his sentence and was represented by lawyer Peter Fernando for his appeal; however his appeal was rejected in September 1991.

== Clemency ==
After losing his appeal, Koh Swee Beng prepared for his impending execution. He made three requests to his family; that a temple at River Valley Road handle his funeral arrangements, that he be cremated and his ashes scattered at sea, and that his organs be donated to others. Koh's appeal lawyer Peter Fernando wrote an eight-page-long appeal to President Wee Kim Wee for Koh's clemency, citing Koh's poor family background and how he always contributed to his family's financial needs, that he was not a member of any secret society, and his good record of service during National Service. However, Koh did not expect to be granted clemency as only four other death row convicts had been granted clemency before.

On 13 May 1992, two days before Koh was due to be hanged, President Wee granted Koh's appeal for clemency and commuted his death sentence to life imprisonment. Before the landmark appeal by Abdul Nasir Amer Hamsah on 20 August 1997, life imprisonment at the time of Koh's offence, conviction and pardon was considered as a fixed jail term of 20 years, with the possibility of one-third reduction of the sentence for good behaviour.

== Aftermath ==
Koh became a devout Buddhist while on death row, and when Koh was granted clemency, he told his family that he wanted to be a monk after his release from prison. His Buddhist beliefs came from influence by another death row inmate, Lim Joo Yin, who was convicted of drug trafficking. Lim's accomplice Sim Ah Cheoh, like Koh, had been granted clemency by the President two months earlier in March 1992, with her death sentence commuted to life imprisonment.

As of 2003, Koh had completed his GCE O-Levels and was taking a two-year Institute of Technical Education course in electronics, and should he continue to show good behaviour, he would be released early in September 2005.

In November 2003, Singaporean crime show True Files re-enacted the Koh Swee Beng case and aired it on television in the thirteenth and final episode of the show's second season.

In May 2005, then President Wee Kim Wee, who pardoned Koh from death row, died at the age of 89. Koh's mother reportedly came to Wee's funeral to pay her respects, expressing her gratitude to Wee for sparing her son's life back in 1992.

== See also ==
- List of major crimes in Singapore
- Capital punishment in Singapore
