= Sim Ah Cheoh =

Singaporean convicted drug trafficker and recipient of presidential clemency

- Sim Ah Cheoh
- Born: c. 1948; Colony of Singapore
- Died: 30 March 1995 (aged 47); Gleneagles Hospital, Singapore
- Occupation: Housewife
- Status: Pardoned and released on 16 February 1995
- Criminal charge: Drug trafficking
- Penalty: Death sentence in 1988, later commuted to life imprisonment in 1992

Sim Ah Cheoh (沈亚彩 Shěn Yàcăi; c. 1948 – 30 March 1995) was a Singaporean drug trafficker of Chinese descent. She was originally sentenced to death in 1988 for the crime, for which she was arrested in 1985, and Sim's two accomplices Lim Joo Yin (林裕炎 Lín Yùyán) and Ronald Tan Chong Ngee (陈忠义 Chen Zhōngyì) were also arrested and received the same sentence, and like Sim, both also lost their appeals against their sentence. Subsequently, while Lim and Tan were executed on 3 April 1992, Sim was granted clemency and her sentence was commuted to life imprisonment, making her the fourth person since 1959, as well as the second female and second drug convict on death row to be pardoned from execution by the President of Singapore.

A year later, Sim was diagnosed with cancer while in prison. As she was found to have around 12 more months left to live, Sim was granted clemency a second time after she applied to the President of Singapore to pardon her and release her to let her receive treatment and spend the final days of her life with her family and sons outside prison. She died at the age of 47 in March 1995, a month after she regained her freedom.

== Early life ==
Sim Ah Cheoh was born in Singapore in 1948. While it is not known if she has any siblings, she had an overall tragic life which was riddled with poverty, suffering and a lack of love.

Sim's mother died at the age of three, and she was living under the care of her grandparents and other relatives until the age of ten. Later, Sim went to live with her father, who has remarried, but she was unloved and neglected by her stepmother while living with her father. After five years of living with her father, Sim became independent. Due to extreme poverty, Sim was only educated till primary three in a Chinese-educated school, and she also worked as a servant, and took up part time jobs at 13 years old.

Sim remained unmarried in her adulthood, but she had two lovers who were married men, and bore a son from each of these two affairs. The elder son was born in 1975 while the younger son was born in 1979. Her eldest son's birth father abandoned her when Sim was four months pregnant in 1975, while her second son's father remained living with his own family (but he did still provide the child living expenses), leaving Sim alone having to raise her sons under extreme poverty. Sim later had one boyfriend Lim Eng Kee, who remained so around the time she was caught trafficking drugs.

After Sim gave birth to her eldest son, she went to work as a bar hostess and then later became an illegal bookie, but her latter business failed, and she owed around $50,000 to loan sharks, which sent her to further financial trouble.

== Death sentence ==
Due to her immense debts and her desperation to discharge them, Sim Ah Cheoh, then 36 years old, was willing to help two drug traffickers to smuggle heroin to the United States of America (USA), after the duo - 31-year-old contractor Lim Joo Yin (alias Ah Hai) and a 31-year-old unemployed man Ronald Tan Chong Ngee (alias Ah Aw; Lim's henchman) - offered to recruit her. The promised payment for the job was S$30,000.

On 26 April 1985, Lim, who supplied the heroin, went to Hotel Negara at Claymore Drive with Tan to meet up with Sim. There were a total of ten packets of heroin, which the men strapped to the body of Sim. Sim was also given a HK$10 (then S$2.60) note and was ordered to hand the drugs to a man, who would give her another HK$10 note with a sequence number similar to her note. She was also told to take a plane bound for Honolulu and thus she headed to Changi Airport.

Upon arrival at the airport however, Sim was arrested by the narcotics police and it also led to the arrests of Tan and Lim at the hotel. All three were charged with drug trafficking. A total of 1.37 kg of heroin, which has an estimated worth of US$2 million (or S$4.08 million), is weighed from the ten bundles carried by Sim. With the amount of heroin found having exceeded the minimum of 15g required under the Misuse of Drugs Act, the mandatory death penalty will be imposed if the trio were found guilty. After the arrest of Sim, her two sons were cared for by their relatives and guardians. Sim's younger son went to live with his father and his father's second wife but eventually moved back to live with his guardian. Lim fruitlessly tried to kill himself while he was in remand facing investigations for his crime.

Sim and her two bosses stood trial in the High Court of Singapore on 7 July 1988. Despite confessing to their respective roles in the crime, all three defendants tried to challenge the validity of their statements, claiming that they were not made voluntarily. In the end, the confessions were ruled admissible as evidence by both the trial judges Lai Kew Chai and Joseph Grimberg. After the prosecutor-in-charge Lee Sing Lit presented his case, the trio were ordered to enter their defence, but they chose to remain silent. Sim's defence lawyers R Palakrishnan and Grace Chacko tried to argue that Sim should not be guilty of trafficking but of possession, since there is a 30-minute lapse between her arrest and arrival at the airport, which means that Sim might have the heroin strapped to her body in the airport's toilet rather than the hotel.

On 29 July 1988, all three accused - Sim Ah Cheoh, Ronald Tan Chong Ngee and Lim Joo Yin - were convicted of drug trafficking and sentenced to death by hanging. All three accused later appealed to the Court of Appeal of Singapore against their sentences, but their appeals were rejected on 19 March 1991.

== Clemency and reprieve ==
After losing her appeals, through her lawyers, Sim Ah Cheoh decided to appeal to Wee Kim Wee, then President of Singapore, for clemency. In the petition, Sim's lawyer R Palakrishnan stated that his client has led a tragic and poor life, and she has no marketable skills, no schooling, and upkeep from home, and was a housewife and single mother of two sons. He stated that these life difficulties resulted in Sim's mental weakness, and caused her to be tempted into crime with the desperation to pay off her debts. John Nicholson of the Salvation Army also pleaded for clemency on behalf of Sim and her younger son. Amnesty International also asked the Singapore government to show mercy on Sim's life on humanitarian grounds.

On 25 March 1992, Sim was granted clemency by President Wee and had her death sentence commuted to life imprisonment, making Sim the fourth person in Singapore since 1959 to be granted clemency. She was also the second woman and second drug convict on death row to receive presidential clemency in Singapore after Siti Aminah Jaffar in 1983.

Before the landmark appeal by Abdul Nasir Amer Hamsah on 20 August 1997, life imprisonment at the time of Sim's offence, conviction and pardon was considered as a fixed jail term of 20 years, with the possibility of one-third reduction of the sentence for good behaviour. Since Sim maintained good behaviour in prison and her newly-imposed life sentence was backdated to the date of her arrest seven years before, Sim would only need to serve six years and four months before she can be released. Sim was subsequently transferred to Changi Women's Prison.

== Cancer and death ==
In November 1993, Sim fell sick while serving her life sentence and was later diagnosed with cervical or uterine cancer in August 1994. In early 1995, after she was told that she had at most one year left to live, Sim appealed to President of Singapore Ong Teng Cheong (who succeeded Wee) to be released so that she could spend the final moments of her life with her sons and relatives. The clemency petition was granted, and Sim was released on 16 February 1995, and reunited with her son, boyfriend and relatives. She was set to go for surgery on 19 March 1995.

Despite the unfavourable medical results, Sim clung on to hope for the sake of her son. Still, she did not respond to medical treatments despite her efforts.

Six weeks after her release, on 30 March 1995, 47-year-old Sim Ah Cheoh died at Gleneagles Hospital. She was reportedly accompanied by her younger son and boyfriend Lim Eng Kee, and her relatives at her deathbed. Her elder son was in a drug rehabilitation centre at the time his mother died.

== Aftermath ==
=== Executions of Lim Joo Yin and Ronald Tan ===
Like Sim Ah Cheoh, both Ronald Tan and Lim Joo Yin also appealed to the President of Singapore for clemency. However, unlike Sim, both of them received news that President Wee Kim Wee rejected their clemency submissions and finalized their death sentences.

On 3 April 1992, 38-year-old Lim Joo Yin and 37-year-old Ronald Tan Chong Ngee were both hanged at dawn in Changi Prison.

=== Fate of Sim's two sons ===
Sim's elder son, who was reportedly named Michael in news reports, was later adopted by a couple in Canada in around 1990. He later moved back to Singapore.

Sim's younger son, who declined to be named, was approached for an interview relating to his mother's case. The boy fondly remembered her as a good mother who often took care of him and his brother, and stated that he wept when he heard about his mother being sentenced to death in 1988, and he was relieved when his mother was reprieved from imminent execution and death row. He kept the newspaper clippings of his mother's case and vowed to not go astray; he turned to reading books, listening to songs on the radio and window shopping with his friends to not adopt any ill habits. The boy said that he feared that his friends might bully him if they found out that his mother was a condemned drug trafficker. Still, he forgave his mother and waited for her return. The news of his mother's illness, which was given by his school principal, was a huge blow to Sim's younger son, who thought that he may be able to live with her again once she regained her freedom.

=== Subsequent cases of clemency ===
Sim was not the last person in Singapore to be pardoned from execution in Singapore, with two other succeeding with pleas to clemency. The first was Koh Swee Beng, a 22-year-old Singaporean who, out of rage and vengeance, gathered his three sworn brothers and two friends to attack 31-year-old moneylender Tay Kim Teck, who earlier assaulted Koh's foster father on 16 February 1988. Tay was killed in the fight after Koh used a knife to stab him five times, leading to two fatal blows that took Tay's life. The subsequent court proceedings ended with Koh receiving the death sentence for murder on 20 April 1990 while the rest were each sentenced to two years' jail and four strokes of the cane for rioting. Even though Koh lost his appeal in September 1991 and had his death warrant finalized, Singapore's then president Wee Kim Wee pardoned Koh and commuted his sentence to life imprisonment on 13 May 1992, two days before Koh's scheduled execution. Koh was released on parole in September 2005 due to good behaviour.

The second was 18-year-old gang member Mathavakannan Kalimuthu, who teamed up with his two friends Selvar Kumar Silvaras (aged 24) and Asogan Ramesh Ramachandren (aged 23) to fight 25-year-old rival gang member Saravanan Michael Ramalingam, who died in the fight on 26 May 1996. Mathavakannan and his friends were sentenced to death in November of the same year. Mathavakannan would end up as the sole member of the trio to receive clemency from then President Ong Teng Cheong in April 1998, which commuted his sentence to life imprisonment while Selvar and Asogan were executed on 29 May 1998. Till today, Mathavakannan, who has been released on parole since 2012, remains as the sixth and last death row inmate in Singapore to have been granted clemency.

=== Posthumous citations of Sim's case ===
Sim's case is once again mentioned more than 30 years later when Malaysian drug trafficker Nagaenthran K. Dharmalingam is facing imminent execution in 2021, with many death penalty opponents appealed for mercy on his life based on his low IQ and alleged intellectual disability. Some also cited Sim's illness which allowed her to be pardoned. However, after failing to obtain a pardon and losing his appeal, Nagaenthran was executed at age 33 on 27 April 2022.

== See also ==
- Capital punishment in Singapore
- Life imprisonment in Singapore
- Mathavakannan Kalimuthu
- List of major crimes in Singapore
