= Joseph Grimberg =

Singaporean lawyer and Supreme Court judge (1933–2017)

Joseph Grimberg SC
- Born: 8 April 1933; Singapore, Straits Settlements
- Died: 17 August 2017 (aged 84); Singapore
- Other name: Joe Grimberg
- Education: Saint Andrew's School; Magdalene College, Cambridge
- Occupation: Lawyer

Joseph Grimberg SC (8 April 1933 – 17 August 2017) was a Singaporean prominent lawyer and former Supreme Court judge.

== Legal career ==
Grimberg was born in Singapore on 8 April 1933 and is of Jewish descent. After briefly attending Saint Andrew's School in Singapore in 1941, he fled to India and England to complete his early education. In 1952, after the war, he read law at Magdalene College, University of Cambridge. He later joined Drew & Napier, when he was called to the Singapore Bar in 1957. He was a senior partner at the law firm from 1967 to 1987, when he was appointed Judicial Commissioner of the Supreme Court in 1987.

During his time as Judicial Commissioner, one of the cases which Grimberg presided was the 1984 Amex banker murder case, where a banker named Frankie Tan was murdered by his foster brother Vasavan Sathiadew and three hired Thai killers, as planned by Tan's wife to avenge his frequent infidelity and spousal abuse. Except for one Thai killer (who escaped Singapore and went missing till today), the rest of the five were arrested and charged with murder. After a trial lasting 45 days, Grimberg, together with High Court judge T. S. Sinnathuray, found three of the four killers (the fourth was found guilty of manslaughter instead) guilty of murder and sentenced them to death by hanging on 6 October 1989. Sinnathuray and Grimberg's verdict was upheld by the Court of Appeal, resulting in the three killers being executed in October 1992.

Grimberg was also one of the two judges (the other being Lai Kew Chai) who sentenced Sim Ah Cheoh, a housewife and single mother of two sons, and her two bosses - Lim Joo Yin and Ronald Tan Chong Ngee - to death in 1988 for attempting to illegally import 1.37 kg of heroin from Singapore to the USA. Sim was later granted clemency and her death sentence was commuted to life imprisonment in 1992, while both Lim and Tan were executed.

In 1989, he re-joined Drew & Napier as a consultant. In 1997, Grimberg became one of the first lawyers in Singapore to be appointed Senior Counsel (SC). Grimberg was also a mentor of Davinder Singh at Drew & Napier.

== Death ==
Grimberg died on 17 August 2017, at the age of 84.

== Legacy ==
Several awards have been named after Grimberg, such as SMU School of Law's Top Advocate prizes and the Singapore Academy of Law's Outstanding Young Advocate prize.
