= Nur Mohammad =

Nur Mohammad (Persian: نور محمد) may refer to:

== Places in Iran ==
- Nur Mohammad Bazar
- Nur Mohammad Dartakideh
- Nur Mohammad, Hirmand
- Nur Mohammad-e Yusef Rudini
- Nur Mohammad Kandi (disambiguation), several places
- Nur Mohammadi Zamaneh

== People ==
- Nur Mohammad (Jamalpur politician), Bangladeshi Awami League politician
- Nur Mohammad (Munshiganj politician), Bangladeshi Jatiya Party politician
- Nur Mohammad (police officer), Bangladeshi politician, ambassador, and police officer
- Nur Mohammad Mondal, Bangladesh Nationalist Party politician
- Nur Mohammad Sheikh (1936–1971), Bangladeshi soldier in the 1971 Liberation War

== Other uses ==
- Nur Mohammad Smriti Mahavidyalaya, a college in West Bengal, India
- Nur Mohammad Stadium, a football and cricket venue in Narail, Bangladesh

== See also ==
- Noor Muhammad (disambiguation)
