= Murder of Quek Lee Eng =

1974 murder in Singapore

Quek Lee Eng
- Quek Lee Eng, the 53-year-old victim
- Born: Quek Lee Eng c. 1921; Singapore, Straits Settlements
- Died: 9 May 1974 (aged 53); Upper Perak Road, Singapore
- Cause of death: Strangulation
- Other names: Kwek Lee Eng; Quek Sock Khing
- Occupation: Tontine operator
- Known for: Murder victim
- Spouse: Sim Keng Soy
- Children: 1+

On 9 May 1974, at the Upper Perak Road house of her sister-in-law, 53-year-old Quek Lee Eng (郭丽英 Guō Lìyīng; also spelt Kwek Lee Eng), alias Quek Sock Khing (郭叔卿 Guō Shūqīng), was strangled by her 44-year-old sister-in-law Sim Joo Keow (沈如娇 Shěn Rújiāo) for a monetary dispute, before Sim dismembered Quek's corpse into multiple parts and abandoned them in various parts of Singapore, including two earthen jars at her own home. The death of Quek was uncovered with the discovery of her legs in a mosque's toilet on Aljunied Road, and the additional sighting of blood flowing out of the earthen jars at Sim's house (where Sim hid the victim's torso) caused Sim to be arrested and charged with murder. Sim was eventually convicted of manslaughter and causing the disappearance of evidence, and thus sentenced to ten years in jail on 27 January 1975.

== Disappearance of Quek ==
On 9 May 1974, 53-year-old Quek Lee Eng, the head of a tontine group and wife of a wealthy local textile merchant Sim Keng Soy (aged 54 in 1974), was last seen leaving for her sister-in-law's house, and she did not return to her Pheng Geck home in Sennett Estate even till nighttime. As a result, Quek was reported missing by her family, whose prior efforts to locate her were met with failure.

As part of their investigations into Quek's disappearance, the police interviewed Quek's family members. One of them was Sim Joo Keow, a 44-year-old mother of six and housewife married to Quek's younger brother. Due to her house being the purported last destination Quek headed to before she went missing, Sim was called in as a witness for questioning. Sim told the police that on the day Quek disappeared, Quek and Sim met up at a bus stop and planned to meet a third person to settle some money matter. However, at the bus stop, a car with a man and a woman pulled up, and Quek entered the car alone while Sim refused to, before the car itself left with Quek inside it, and Sim claimed it was the last time she saw Quek before she went missing.

While she was being probed by the police, Sim was interrupted by her daughter Quek Pek Hiah (郭碧霞 Guō Bìxiá), who urged her mother to speak the truth, and as it turned out, Sim had earlier told her daughter a different story of what happened to Quek. Sim was said to have given two different versions of what happened to Quek; one of them was the account Sim provided to the police and also recounted to her daughter much earlier, and the other, which was recounted right before the police probe, was that Quek came to Sim's house with a couple, and over there, Quek quarreled with the couple over some money issues, and Sim said she witnessed the man using a knife to slash Quek on the face, and Sim herself was punched into the eye when she tried to intervene and diffuse the fight. Sim said she ran out of her house after this, but by the time she returned, Quek was nowhere to be seen. Regardless, the police inspector took note of the differing accounts provided by Sim about Quek's last known whereabouts, and he requested to have a search in Sim's rented two-storey house at Upper Perak Road (located in present-day Jalan Besar). However, the inspector did not find anything suspicious, and Quek remained classified as a missing person since then.

== Discovery of body parts ==
44-year-old Sim Joo Keow, who was arrested for murder after severed parts of Quek's torso were discovered in her home

On 11 May 1974, the police responded to a report of a grisly finding at a public toilet in a mosque located at Aljunied Road. The unidentified male witness informed the police in the report that he discovered a pair of severed legs inside the toilet itself. Professor Chao Tzee Cheng, a senior forensic pathologist, was called to the scene and after inspecting the body parts, he confirmed that the severed legs belonged to a woman, and they were possibly being chopped off less than 24 hours before. The police suspected that these legs were possibly connected to the disappearance of Quek Lee Eng, who had been missing for two days at the time of the horrific discovery.

The day the legs were discovered, Sim Joo Keow called her husband Quek Huang Phoew (郭方标 Guō Fāngbiāo) and asked him to go home. According to Sim's husband, when he arrived home, he caught sight of blood trickling down the earthenware jars inside his house, and witnessed a swarm of flies hovering around the jars, and he also picked up a strong but bad smell emitting from the jars. When the police arrived at the house, which was Quek's last destination before she went missing, they were also taken aback by the terrible smell, and they apprehended Sim as a suspect. The police also searched the house and an upper torso, wrapped in plastic bags from then-popular department store Yaohan, was discovered inside an earthen jar on the ground floor. Similarly, a lower torso was discovered hidden in another earthen jar located on the second floor, but the head and arms of the victim were not found inside the house. The upper and lower torsos were later confirmed to be Quek's, and the legs were similarly identified as Quek's legs. It was speculated that Quek had put up a struggle before her death, based on the bruises found on pieces of her corpse recovered.

After her arrest, Sim reportedly wanted to come clean and told the police that she actually killed Quek, and she led the officers to the various locations where she claimed to have disposed of the remaining body parts. After a search around the Kallang River, the police discovered a parcel containing the severed arms and severed head of 53-year-old Quek Lee Eng at the riverside. Sim even led the police to her house's bathroom, where she allegedly butchered up the body of Quek into pieces after she murdered her, although Inspector Daniel Tan noted that the bathroom was clean with no bloodstains and had no signs of foul odour inside it. Quek's clothes, handbag and a meat cleaver used by Sim to cut up the body were also recovered by the police, and the disappearance of Quek was re-classified as murder. After the recovery of all of Quek's body parts, they were cremated after a funeral at the Poh Kark See Crematorium in Sembawang on 16 May 1974, and many relatives, including Quek's grandchildren, attended the funeral. A huge crowd of onlookers also watched a hearse carrying Quek's remains before her cremation.

On 13 May 1974, 44-year-old Sim Joo Keow was charged with the murder of Quek Lee Eng at a district court, and the magistrate David Gerald ordered that Sim should be remanded in police custody to assist the police in their investigations. When Sim reappeared another week later in court to face the charge sheet, a crowd of over 500 people gathered at the Supreme Court of Singapore to catch a glimpse of Sim, after her case made the headlines and shocked the public. Sim was ordered to be placed under remand at the Woodbridge Hospital for psychiatric evaluation on 3 June 1974, and this remand order was extended a week later.

After a two-day preliminary inquiry, Sim was committed to stand trial on a later date for murder on 31 July 1974, and over 170 exhibits of evidence were reportedly presented during the hearing. If found guilty of murder, Sim would be sentenced to the mandatory death penalty under Section 302 of the Penal Code.

== Sim Joo Keow's confession ==
After her arrest for Quek Lee Eng's death, Sim Joo Keow admitted to murdering her sister-in-law over a monetary matter. The following was the official version of what happened, based on Sim's confession and the evidence gathered by the police.

Investigations showed that Sim and Quek shared a good relationship prior to the murder, and Sim was a part of a tontine group (with at least ten other people) established by Quek. A tontine scheme was a type of financial scheme where participants would contribute their share of money to the tontine scheme and receives annual shares of the money divided among them, and as subscribers die one by one, their shares would be distributed among the remaining members who got increased payouts in return, and this scheme ultimately ends with the death of the final survivor, or that the final survivor gets to keep all the money. Sim would regularly contribute to the scheme and also receive her share of the payouts.

On the date of the murder itself, Quek went to Sim's house at Upper Perak Road to collect a sum of S$2,000 which Sim owed to her. However, Sim did not have the money and then things turned sour between both women, who fought over the money. According to Sim, she was first punched in the eye by Quek, leaving a blue-black mark on her eye. Sim retaliated in anger and strangled Quek until the 53-year-old woman died. After it dawned upon her that Quek had died during the struggle, Sim was desperate to cover up her crime and chose to dismember the body. Sim used a meat chopper and hammered it down with a block of wood, imitating the way of fishmongers chopping fishes at the market, and hence separated Quek's body into seven pieces, mainly all four limbs, upper torso, lower torso and head.

After completing the dismemberment, Sim wrapped up the lower and upper torsos with plastic bags and hid them inside the earthenware jars at her house. Afterwards, Sim would dispose of the head and limbs in two different parts of Singapore, first the legs (packed in a plastic bag) at the toilet of a mosque at Aljunied, and then the head and arms (all of which packed in a parcel) at Kallang River.

== Sim's plea of guilt and sentencing ==
On 27 January 1975, the first day of Sim Joo Keow's trial, the prosecution, led by Alan Wong Hoi Ping, reduced the charge of murder to one of manslaughter, which effectively spared Sim from the death sentence for murdering Quek. Justice Choor Singh convicted Sim of one count of manslaughter and one count of causing the disappearance of evidence, after Sim pleaded guilty in a hearing convened at the High Court. After the statement of facts were presented in court, the defence and prosecution made their final submissions before Sim's sentencing, and Sim's lawyer S. K. Lee was allowed to make a mitigation plea on her behalf. Lee argued that there were misconceptions from the public that his client had dismembered Quek Lee Eng while she was still alive, and he emphasized that Quek had already died when the dismemberment happened, and Sim herself was full of panic when she found out that Quek died in the course of a violent struggle between the both of them, and she thus resorted to disposing of Quek's remains in the most gruesome manner, and he therefore asked the court to show mercy on Sim.

After some deliberation, Justice Singh delivered his verdict, sentencing Sim to ten years' imprisonment for the first charge of manslaughter and three years' imprisonment for the second charge of causing evidence to disappear. Although the prosecution asked for the two jail terms for both charges to run consecutively (which would potentially made Sim serve 13 years in jail), Justice Singh disagreed and ordered the sentences to take effect concurrently from the date of Sim's arrest. As a result, 44-year-old Sim Joo Keow was to serve ten years in prison for the killing and dismemberment of Quek Lee Eng.

== Aftermath ==
In the aftermath of the killing, Quek's surviving family members were still struggling to cope with her death. Quek's son, a lawyer, agreed to be interviewed in 2005, 31 years after the case, and he told the press that whenever the date of his mother's death anniversary arrived, he and his kin would talk about her but cried whenever they mentioned her. Quek's son stated that he did not want to bring up his mother's case again since it had been more than 30 years, as he did not wish to make his father hurt again by the case. Since then, the present fate and whereabouts of Quek's family is unknown. Similarly, the whereabouts and final fate of Sim Joo Keow, who was released from jail since 1984, as well as her family members, were unknown since then.

The killing of Quek Lee Eng and subsequent dismemberment greatly shocked the nation during Singapore's first decade as an independent country since 1965, and sparked a mass amount of attention in society when the incident first came into light. The murder of Quek, dubbed the "Tontine killing" in Singaporean media, was Singapore's first case of murder where the victim had his/her body dismembered since 1965. There were several more similar cases - including the 1974 Linda Culley suitcase murder case, the 1983 murder of Goh Pek Hua, the 1995 case of British serial killer John Martin Scripps, the 2005 Kallang River body parts murder, the 2005 Orchard Road body parts murder, the 2013 death of Jasvinder Kaur, and the 2014 murder of Muhammad Noor - that involved the murder of victim(s) who were dismembered after their deaths. Additionally, in the 1970s itself, the Tontine killing case was ranked among the top most high-profile murders occurred when it was recalled through the media coverage of the 1979 Geylang Bahru family murders, which concerned the unsolved deaths of four children in their flat, and its infamy persisted in 1990 when The New Paper recalled some of the shocking crimes that previously occurred in Singapore (among which also included the Adrian Lim murders). Despite the numerous decades that passed since the occurrence of the Tontine killing as of today, the case remains as one of Singapore's most horrific murders ever committed to date.

In 1987, Nicky Moey, a horror fiction writer, wrote a book titled 999: True Cases from the CID, which detailed 11 high-profile crimes that happened in Singapore and made the headlines between 1960 and 1984. The killing and dismemberment of Quek Lee Eng was recorded in the book, and it was reported that the names of some offenders (possibly including Sim) were changed in spite of the cases being true crimes that happened in the past. In 1992, Sumiko Tan, a writer and journalist who wrote for the national newspaper The Straits Times, penned and published a book titled Sisters In Crime, which narrated the high-profile cases of women committing heinous and horrific crimes (mostly murder) in Singapore, and Sim Joo Keow was one of these women whose crimes were covered in the book itself.

In July 2015, Singapore's national daily newspaper The Straits Times published a e-book titled Guilty As Charged: 25 Crimes That Have Shaken Singapore Since 1965, which included Quek Lee Eng's murder as one of the top 25 crimes that shocked the nation since its independence in 1965. The book was borne out of collaboration between the Singapore Police Force and the newspaper itself. The e-book was edited by ST News Associate editor Abdul Hafiz bin Abdul Samad. The paperback edition of the book was published and first hit bookshelves in June 2017. The paperback edition first entered the ST bestseller list on 8 August 2017, a month after publication.

== See also ==
- John Martin Scripps
- Kallang River body parts murder
- Orchard Road body parts murder
- Murder of Muhammad Noor
- List of major crimes in Singapore
- List of solved missing person cases (1970s)
