= Noor Muhammad (disambiguation) =

Noor Muhammad may also refer to:

- Noor Muhammad, (1936–2010), Pakistani Islamic scholar, writer and politician
- Noor Muhammad Butt, (1936), Pakistani nuclear physicist
- Noor Muhammad Jadmani, (1955), former Pakistan's Ambassador to Japan
- Noor Muhammad Khan, Bangladeshi politician
- Noor Muhammad Lakhir, (1845–1937), Sindhi nationalist, educationist and freedom fighter
- Noor Muhammad Lashari, Radio and tv artist of Sindh
- Noor Muhammad Dummar, Pakistani politician
- Noor Mohammad Kalhoro, (1698–1755), ruled over Sindh as Subahdar of Mughal Emperor
- Noor Mohammad Saqib, Afghan Taliban politician
- Noor Mohammad Islamjar, Afghan Taliban politician
- Noor Mohammad Rohani, Afghan Taliban politician

== See also ==
- Nur Mohammad (disambiguation)
- Muhammad Noor (disambiguation)
