= Muhammad Noor (disambiguation) =

Muhammad Noor (1925–2000) was an Indian footballer.

Muhammad Noor may also refer to:

- Mohamed Noor, academic administrator and geneticist
- Mohammed Noor (born 1978), Saudi Arabian footballer
- Mohammad Noor, Indonesian politician
- Mohamud Noor, American politician and computer scientist
- Mohamed Noor (born 1985), convicted of the killing of Justine Damond
- Muhammad Noor (1955–2014), a Pakistani tissue seller who was murdered in Singapore
- Mohammed Nour Abdelkerim, Chadian rebel leader

== See also ==
- Noor Muhammad (disambiguation)
