= Kallang River body parts murder =

2005 murder and dismemberment case in Singapore

- Date: 15 June 2005; 21 years ago
- Location: Kallang River, Singapore
- Motive: to avoid being recognised by lover as culprit who stole her credit cards and money, and to conceal his affair for fear of losing respect of family, reputation and job
- Deaths: 1
- Suspects: • Leong Siew Chor, 50

Liu Hong Mei
- 刘红梅
- Born: Liu Hongmei; 14 September 1982; Changchun, Jilin, China
- Died: 15 June 2005 (aged 22); Geylang, Singapore
- Cause of death: Strangulation
- Resting place: An unspecified cemetery in China
- Education: Senior middle school level
- Occupation: Production operator
- Employer: Agere Systems Singapore
- Known for: Murder victim
- Height: 160 cm (5 ft 3 in)

The Kallang River body parts murder was a murder and dismemberment case that occurred in Singapore in June 2005. The case earned its name due to the body parts of the victim, 22-year-old Liu Hong Mei (Chinese: 刘红梅; pinyin: Líu Hóngmeí), being found disposed off in Kallang River. In this case, Liu's 50-year-old supervisor, Leong Siew Chor, used a towel to strangle her to death, and severed her body into seven pieces - mainly her head, upper torso, lower torso, legs and feet - before disposing them off in Kallang River and other locations in Singapore.

Leong, a married man with three adult children, was revealed to have engaged in an illicit sexual affair with Liu for a year before murdering her on 15 June 2005, as a result of wanting to cover up the affair and theft of Liu's credit cards and money from her bank account. He was arrested three days after the murder, and the police also managed to locate five of her body parts. Liu's severed feet were never found.

Leong was eventually found guilty of Liu's murder and condemned to death by the High Court on 19 May 2006. After failing to receive an acquittal of the murder charge and clemency from the Court of Appeal and the President of Singapore respectively, Leong was executed on 30 November 2007. This case became one of the most notorious murder cases to have occurred in Singapore, as well as earning its recognition as one of the famous cases taken by criminal lawyer Subhas Anandan, who represented Leong in his trial and recorded the case in his memoir.

== Discovery of body parts at Kallang River ==
On the morning of 16 June 2005, 27-year-old cleaner Murugan Kaniapan chanced upon a waterlogged, brown cardboard box sealed with masking tape lying on the banks of the Kallang River. Murugan went to pick up the parcel to dispose of it but the water damage was too severe. The damage caused the box to fall apart in his hands, and a green plastic bag fell out of the parcel. He discovered the severed lower torso of a woman inside it. The naked body part had been cleanly severed at the pelvis and knee joints. Murugan described that the body part looked like fresh meat, and it was so fresh that it looked as though the woman did not die at all. He said there was no blood and no smell, and the exposed knee bone looked white.

Murugan contacted the police, who were told of the discovery. The police combed the nearby areas of Kallang River on a two-kilometre radius for possible signs of other body parts. A short while later, at about 200 m away from where they found the body part, a red-and-white printer box was discovered and inside it, it contained a woman's severed upper torso with arms and hands attached. The body part was wrapped up in plastic bags and some torn pages of old issues of a local Chinese newspaper Lianhe Wanbao. The two body parts were later matched and found to be coming from the same person.

The pathologist who conducted an autopsy on Liu, Dr Teo Eng Swee, was unable to determine the cause of death, as there were no defensive injuries found on the victim. The head, shins and feet were also missing from the body, which made it hard to pin down the cause of death. He also verified there was no sexual assault since there were no DNA found in the swabs made on her sexual organs.

== Investigations and arrest of the suspect ==
The Singapore Police Force commenced their investigations as soon as the body parts were discovered. The forensic experts who received the body parts in the mortuary managed to extract fingerprints from the upper torso. After searching in their database, the police found a match to the fingerprints, and they belonged to a 22-year-old Chinese national named Liu Hong Mei. Liu, the third out of four children, was a native of Changchun, China, who first came to Singapore to work in 2003. Her sister was also in Singapore and was soon to be married to a Singaporean some months later. She was found to be employed at Agere Systems Singapore as a production operator. Her colleagues had earlier filed a missing persons report of Liu, who was absent from her night shift since the night before.

The police then headed to Agere, where they interviewed Liu's colleagues. Liu was said to be well-liked and was a cheerful colleague who got along well with others. However, as the police enquired further, they found that Liu was promoted twice soon after her employment. The short period of time she spent between her first employment and promotion earned some dissatisfaction from the people in her workplace, and it was aggravated by many instances where Liu was physically intimate with her supervisor Leong Siew Chor, a 50-year-old married man and father of three. These intimate behaviours include kissing and hugging. They had been reprimanded after a colleague complained to the management about their inappropriate behaviour.

The police decided to interview Liu's supervisor Leong Siew Chor. At that point, the investigators did not tell him that Liu's body was found. However, Inspector Roy Lim noticed that Leong was acting suspiciously. He acted defensively, denying any relationship with Liu, and his hands were trembling. Inspector Lim even noticed a few small cuts on Leong's fingers. It was then the police took him back to the police station for further questioning. Ten hours after being detained, Leong confessed to the police that he killed Liu, but he stated it was done so out of consent from Liu, who made a lovers' suicide pact with him, and he also confessed to having an affair with Liu since a year ago. On 18 June 2005, merely three days after the discovery of Liu's body parts, 50-year-old Leong Siew Chor was charged with murder. If found guilty, Leong would be sentenced to death.

Upon receiving news of his arrest, Leong's wife and eldest child, a daughter, who were on their holiday trip to Thailand, quickly returned to Singapore to meet up with the couple's younger two children, a son (the middle child) and another daughter (the youngest child), and they together went to be present at the hearing where Leong was first charged. The family later engaged Singapore's leading criminal lawyer Subhas Anandan to represent their father and husband in the court process. Anandan, who was well known for defending high-profile criminals, including notorious wife-killer Anthony Ler, accepted the case. Anandan's nephew and newly qualified lawyer Sunil Sudheesan assisted him to defend Leong. However, in view of pending and ongoing investigations, Anandan was not allowed to meet Leong until 9 July 2005.

The murder not only made headlines in Singapore, but also reported extensively in China, especially in the region where Liu was born and raised in. Many people who knew Liu Hong Mei and her family tried to conceal the truth of her death from her parents.

== Perpetrator ==
Leong Siew Chor
- 梁少初
- Born: 19 April 1955; Colony of Singapore
- Died: 30 November 2007 (aged 52); Changi Prison, Singapore
- Cause of death: Execution by hanging
- Status: Executed
- Conviction: Murder
- Penalty: Death

Details
- Victims: 1
- Date: 15 June 2005
- Country: Singapore
- Date apprehended: 18 June 2005

Leong Siew Chor (Chinese: 梁少初; Jyutping: Loeng4 Siu3 Co1; pinyin: Liáng Shàochū), a Chinese Singaporean, was born on 19 April 1955. He had an identical twin brother, who grew up and lived with him in Singapore.

Leong was married to an unknown woman after reaching adulthood. In total, the couple had three children: a son and two daughters. His eldest daughter was a teacher while his only son was still an undergraduate student at the time Leong faced charges of murder and theft. Leong, who completed his pre-university education and National Service, joined Singtel as an employee and worked for approximately 20 years between 1976 and 1996. During his employment at Singtel, Leong was enrolled in a diploma course in Singapore Polytechnic and obtained a diploma in Electronics and Communication Engineering in 1983. Leong was able to understand English as a result of his relatively highly educated background.

In February 1996, Leong decided to leave Singtel and set up his own business, which failed. In April 1997, Leong decided to apply as a production supervisor at Lucent Technologies Microelectronics Pte Ltd, which was eventually restructured and renamed as Agere Systems Singapore Pte Ltd. Leong was deployed at Agere's factory in Serangoon North Avenue 5 and assigned a permanent night shift from 7:00pm to 7:00am the next day. As of May 2005, his gross monthly salary as a factory supervisor was worth S$3,743, not excluding his shift allowance.

Leong's neighbours described him as a loving father and husband to his family. Many who knew him were shocked to first hear that he was the suspected murderer when the media was full of the news of his arrest.

According to Liu's coworkers, Leong had given her a hard and stressful time as her supervisor for the next 3 months after their first meeting. It was later revealed in court that Liu Hong Mei became Leong's lover, despite her age being younger than two of Leong's children and being half of Leong's actual age. This affair started when she was first assigned to work under Leong's supervision. From this affair, Liu was promoted twice and they became close to each other, to the point that they became publicly intimate and kissed and hugged each other.

On 14 September 2004, they were finally caught and reported for kissing each other. Both Liu and Leong were given a verbal warning by the company's higher staff for the inappropriate behaviours in the workplace. Leong claimed that he did so because it was Liu's birthday on that day they were caught. Liu's colleagues noted that she started to have doubts about the affair following this warning. Despite that, the pair continued their illicit relationship, and it lasted for about a year before Liu's murder.

== Further investigations ==
=== Search in Leong's matrimonial home ===
The meat cleaver used by Leong Siew Chor to dismember Liu's corpse

On 18 June 2005, after he was charged for murder, Leong was brought back to his flat in Lorong 3, Geylang, where many reporters filmed scenes of police officers entering and leaving the ninth-floor unit with collected evidence for purposes of their investigations.

Among the items collected were a partially damaged meat cleaver, a rubber mallet, some Chinese language newspapers with their pages missing, plastic bags, some of Leong's clothes previously worn before his arrest, and a towel he allegedly used to strangle Liu to death. Forensic pathologist Dr Teo Eng Swee, who conducted an autopsy on the victim, found tiny shards of metal fragments stuck to the muscles of Liu's severed left leg (later recovered after Leong was arrested). These metal fragments were later matched to the meat cleaver, which Leong claimed to have used to dismember Liu.

The torn pages of newspapers found wrapped around the body parts were also revealed to be the missing pages from Leong's subscribed newspapers, which the police confiscated. The fabric fibres found on the boxes were also matched to those of Leong's clothes, and the masking tape found on the carton boxes also came from Leong's home. The plastic bags used to wrap the body parts were the same as those found in the bedroom of Leong's 24-year-old son.

The police also searched the toilet where Leong dismembered the body, as what he told the police. The bathroom was clean and spotless without any stains or smell of blood. According to Inspector Roy Lim, he stated that the unusual cleanliness of the crime scene reminded him of a superior's case report which he read about ten years ago. In another murder case in Singapore, British serial killer John Martin Scripps, who was executed for a South African tourist's murder in a Singapore hotel, has also dismembered the body and disposed of it, before he cleaned up the hotel room's bathroom. Similarly, the crime scene was clean without bloodstains or smell, but under the sink, Lim's superior found a bloodstain that belonged to the dead victim. Having recalled this, Lim checked under the sink but there was no bloodstain. It was only when he looked underneath the toilet bowl then he discovered a small red stain. The forensic tests later confirmed that red stain was blood, and it matched Liu's DNA.

It was also revealed that during the course of investigations, Leong's family were being repeatedly harassed by many members of the public, who came to their flat to disturb and condemn them out of anger over the murder of Liu. Some also burned joss sticks outside the flat to pray for lottery numbers and to cleanse the flat, while others threw things inside the flat. This harassment also caused a nuisance to the Leong family's neighbours. They were eventually forced to move out to get some peace. Nobody wanted to buy the flat for fear that the place was haunted and warrant bad luck for people, since a murder took place in it. The HDB unit remains as one of the notorious death flats where it involves an unnatural death or murder.

=== Search for missing body parts ===
Even after Leong's arrest, the police continued their search for the remaining body parts of the deceased Liu Hong Mei. A 30-member police team from Special Operations searched the banks and bushes surrounding the Kallang River. The Police Coast Guard sent out patrol boats to sail the river up to its opening with the sea to look for the missing head, feet and legs. This search also extended to the Singapore River.

Eventually, the police headed to the Tuas incineration plant to search for the remaining body parts where trash was going to be incinerated. They received information that the Singapore River would be cleared of its trash every few days, in which it coincided with the time after Leong disposed of her body parts and before he was arrested, and the rubbish would be sent to the Tuas incineration plant. Ten hours later, the police found a decomposed head wrapped in newspaper and stuffed into a yellow plastic bag. A pair of severed legs were also found. Although the head has decomposed to the extent of beyond recognition, Dr Teo confirmed that the head belonged to the victim Liu Hong Mei after matching her malformed tooth to the one shown in her toothy smile from her personal photographs. The severed feet were never found.

A funeral was held for the deceased Liu on 11 July 2005, after the body parts were released for funeral preparations. It was attended by 150 people, including well wishers to curious gawkers, with some who came hoping to get lucky lottery numbers. Many of the attendees said they were sorry for the victim. Undertaker Roland Tay and his wife Sally Ho held the funeral on the behalf of Liu's family. Liu's sister could not bear to attend, and had her own personal difficulties. Liu's brother also said the family could not bear to go there. Liu's body parts were sewn back together, with a pair of wax feet being attached to her body. Her body was cremated and the ashes were sent back to her hometown in China. Her coffin was filled with her favourite toys, books and clothes before its cremation at Mandai Crematorium.

=== Leong's first statements ===
Meanwhile, in his first statements, Leong denied the murder charge. He said that having been together for a year, Liu Hong Mei, who came to his house on the morning of 15 June 2005, had asked him if he can come back to China with her to start anew together. Leong said he could not bear to do so because he still loved his wife and three adult children. He said that Liu, who was feeling despondent about their relationship, suggested to him that they shall die together. Leong also claimed that to show her sincerity, Liu willingly allowed him to strangle her first, then he shall strangle himself. Leong agreed to since he similarly felt despondent about the hopeless future of their relationship. He insisted that he loved her and felt mentally tortured about her death, and claimed no intention to kill her.

Using a towel, Leong claimed he strangled Liu from the front until she died. Initially, Leong contemplated killing himself by strangulation after Liu's death in accordance with their mutual suicide pact, but upon seeing her bluish face, Leong backed off and could not bring himself to do it. Out of panic to conceal the body, given that one of his daughters was due to come home later in the evening, he knew that he had to do it quickly. Leong then told Inspector Lim that he used a meat cleaver and a rubber mallet to dismember Liu's body. He did so by knocking the mallet against the cleaver to cut through the bones. In total, he chopped up the body into seven pieces, mainly her head, upper torso, lower torso, shins and feet, before packing them up in five separate packages using boxes and plastic bags.

After he had finished, Leong said that he washed the toilet and cleaned himself up. He then rode his son's bicycle to dispose of the feet and both Liu's shoes and belongings. Afterwards, he quickly returned home to dispose of the other body parts into Kallang River and other places. After disposing of the body parts, Leong returned home at 5 pm to clean up the meat cleaver, and prepared to go to work in his usual night shift at 7 pm.

=== Alleged ATM card theft and Leong's confession ===
However, further police investigations revealed a detail that did not seem to corroborate with Leong's claim of a love suicide pact between him and Liu. The investigators found out that two days before her death, Liu had made a police report about her ATM card being stolen and unauthorized withdrawals of her savings from her bank accounts in different locations within Singapore. In total, about $2,000 - her life's savings - was stolen from her. The police went to check the CCTV footage around the ATMs where these unauthorized withdrawals took place. In all the footage, they saw a slim man wearing a cap and hoodie making these withdrawals, and the investigators suspected that this person was Leong Siew Chor. The police thus suspected that Leong was not telling the truth, as the motive for Liu's death might be related to theft.

However, at one point, the police investigations were thrown into a brief confusion, as they found out that Leong had an identical twin brother, who also lived in Singapore. Dr Teo Eng Swee, the pathologist, stated that if identical twins were involved in a murder case, it would be difficult to tell who was the real killer as scientifically speaking, the identical twins shared the same DNA. Should their DNA be recovered from a crime scene where a murder occurred, it would be hard to deduce who was the killer. Inspector Roy Lim also speculated that Leong might be covering up for his brother, who could be the one that killed Liu and stole her ATM cards.

It was found that the twin brother had an alibi throughout the week leading up to Liu's murder and on the day she died. There was also no evidence that Liu had met Leong's twin brother. Hence, the man seen at the ATM could only be Leong. When he faced the discovery of the theft, Leong said that it was a prank between him and Liu, and he claimed that he had returned her the money he withdrew from her account. However, the police could not find any evidence from both Leong's and Liu's homes which indicated that Leong had returned Liu her money.

Police officers also found that Liu had taken up night-classes in mastering the English language, as she intended to study in a local polytechnic and get a diploma in tourism. She also looked forward to becoming the bridesmaid of her sister Hong Wei's upcoming wedding and did well in her job, as well as going to a dating agency to look for a prospective boyfriend, given her knowledge that her relationship with Leong will not be progressing and ending well. The optimistic mood Liu displayed during her final days up to her death made it unlikely that Liu had the reason to kill herself.

Ten days after his arrest, Leong finally confessed, withdrawing his initial statements and telling the police the truth. Leong said that he stole the ATM cards when Liu was showering, after they had sex in a hotel room on 13 June 2005, and had used her money for shopping. He said that he was fearful that Liu might recognise him from the CCTV footage, and should he be arrested and convicted of theft, it meant that the truth about Leong's affair would become public knowledge to his family and all those who knew him. If they knew the truth, he would potentially lose his job, reputation and respect from his family and friends. Due to this, he decided to lure Liu into his home during that morning on 15 June 2005 before she made her trip to the bank, where he strangled her to death.

Despite this confession, Leong would still have to face trial and he would challenge his confession when the Kallang body parts trial first started on 3 May 2006.

== High Court sentencing ==
=== Proceedings ===
On 3 May 2006, nearly 11 months after his arrest, 51-year-old Leong Siew Chor first stood trial in the High Court of Singapore (the lower division of the Supreme Court) for the murder of Liu Hong Mei.

At the start of the trial, the prosecution, led by Deputy Public Prosecutor (DPP) Lau Wing Yum of the AGC, based its case on the statements and confession made by Leong during his remand. As Leong began to take the stand after the prosecution finished presenting its case, Leong suddenly changed his story. He challenged the validity of his confession, saying that it was the investigating officer Roy Lim who gained his trust and induced him into penning down the incriminating statements. He also alleged that the inspector treated him kindly and even bought him some Chinese herbal tea to slowly gain Leong's trust and made Leong compelled to allow the police officer to record his statements that were favourable to him and help him reduce the murder charge.

However, Inspector Lim denied the allegation. He said that a week after Leong made his confession to his motive of murder, Leong told him that he was feeling heaty, which made Lim decide to go to Smith Street in Chinatown to buy two bottles of herbal tea. He duly produced his notebook where he recorded his story, which proven that the herbal tea was indeed bought after Leong confessed, unlike what Leong claimed. After this, the trial judge Tay Yong Kwang ruled that Leong's confession was admissible as evidence.

On the stand, Leong reverted to his original story, and he claimed that the death of Liu was done due to a love suicide pact between both of them. He said that Liu willingly allowed her lover to strangle her to death to show her sincerity and love for her. Leong said essentially the same about what he told the police about the suicide pact. Would Leong have been successful in proving it as a defence against the murder charge, he would instead be found guilty of culpable homicide not amounting to murder (or manslaughter), and faced either the maximum term of life imprisonment or up to ten years' imprisonment. Regarding the fact of Liu's supposed despondency over the affair, the police's evidence of her true optimistic feelings towards the future raised doubts over this part of Leong's suicide pact story. It was reported that Leong had broken down when he saw the towel he used to kill Liu.

A scene from a documentary depicts a sketch of Leong (right, bespectacled) demonstrating in court how he strangled Liu with the towel, and Leong's lawyer Sunil Sudheesan portrays as the victim Liu in this demonstration. The Chinese and Malay subtitles below the scene, when translated to English, meant: "... strangled the deceased (Liu), he (Leong) had a strange smile on his face."

Leong was later told to demonstrate how he strangled Liu. He had earlier claimed that he was strangling her from the front with a towel. One of Leong's lawyers Sunil Sudheesan volunteered as the mannequin for Leong's demonstration. The audience in the viewing gallery were reportedly murmuring as they looked at the demonstration. Crime reporter and journalist Selina Lum, who wrote for The Straits Times, said in an interview that when she saw Leong demonstrating how he strangled the victim with the towel, she noticed that Leong had a strange smile on his face. That smile, she said, had chilled the reporter to the bone and her mind was full of questions of what exactly went through Leong's mind at this point of time. Lum also said that Leong's defence of the victim allowing herself to be killed was a defence which many murderers rarely used against the charge of murder in Singapore itself, even though it was a legally recognised form of partial defence against murder under the law.

Throughout the trial, Leong's family members were not present to witness the court proceedings. Still, they would visit him in prison and get updates from Leong's lawyers about the developments of the case.

=== Sentence ===
On 19 May 2006, after a trial lasting 16 days, in a courtroom full of reporters and members of the public, Justice Tay Yong Kwang delivered his verdict.

In his judgement, Justice Tay refused to reduce the murder charge as he disbelieved Leong's claims of a suicide pact. Liu, who was "a lively, young woman in the vernal stage of her life", could not have a reason to commit suicide since she was not indicative of a despondent, suicidal person and had high hopes for her future even up till the day of her death. The judge admonished Leong for the cold-blooded nature of the crime and his lack of remorse, in which he had not only stolen the heart of the deceased, he also robbed her of her hard-earned savings and ATM cards, and then finally, and remorselessly, he deprived her of her right to live. He also said that the calculated manner of Liu's death and swift disposal of her body parts did not indicate Leong as a man who was agonised over the death of the love of his life.

The judge also stated that from all the evidence, it was more reasonable for Leong to have a motive to kill Liu rather than her consenting to it, as given the potential risk of losing the respect from his family, his job and reputation as a result of theft should the truth be reported, Leong had to silence Liu forever despite his feelings for her. It was also common sense in his position that from the CCTV footage, even if he disguised himself, there was every possibility for him to be recognised as the thief, which meant he might have to kill her. In his verdict, Justice Tay compared the case as a contrast to William Shakespeare's classic tragic tale of Romeo and Juliet:

In the classic tragic tale of ill-fated love, the luckless lover committed suicide. Here, Romeo killed Juliet. The accused (Leong) stole the deceased's (Liu’s) heart, then pilfered her card and hard-earned savings and finally robbed her of her life. He butchered her after her death and took her apart. The deceased’s demise in the Geylang flat on 15 June 2005 was no spontaneous suicide. It was a horrific homicide. It was a most disgusting and despicable murder. Liu Hong Mei died a very cruel, heartbreaking death.

Justice Tay found 51-year-old Leong Siew Chor guilty of murder under Section 300(a) of the Penal Code and sentenced him to death by hanging.

== Appeal and clemency process ==
=== First appeal to the Court of Appeal ===
After the end of his trial in the High Court, Leong submitted an appeal to the Court of Appeal of Singapore, the higher division of the Supreme Court in the nation. Leong's lawyers argued that he killed Liu with her consent and made the same arguments as the ones they made in the High Court against the murder charge, among which included the possible inducement made by the police to convince Leong to create incriminating statements which they sought to challenge.

However, like the original trial judge, the three judges in the Court of Appeal did not believe Leong's story of a suicide pact, and the other arguments did not hold much weight in the judges' mind. In particular about the suicide pact, one of them, V. K. Rajah, retorted in court, "If he could not bear to leave his family, why would he want to take his life away?" Another judge, High Court judge Choo Han Teck also said to the defendant, "Which man who claims to love a woman so much that he follows her to her death would steal her ATM card and money?" As such, both Choo and Rajah, together with a third judge, Woo Bih Li, unanimously dismissed the appeal on 28 September 2006, as they found Leong's story too incredulous for them to accept.

=== Second appeal to the Court of Appeal ===
Nearly a year after the failure of his first appeal, on 22 August 2007, Leong launched a criminal motion to have his first appeal reopened for hearing. Anandan argued to a new three-judge panel that during the first appeal, the original three judges took into consideration three police statements that were not admitted as evidence in the trial while making their decision. One of these statements contained Leong's confession regarding his true motive to kill Liu.

However, the three Supreme Court judges Kan Ting Chiu, Tan Lee Meng and Belinda Ang dismissed the criminal motion minutes after its first hearing session. Explaining on behalf of the panel regarding the dismissal, Justice Kan said that the three statements were not the key factor in the Court of Appeal's first decision and it was based on the merits of the arguments made that allowed the original three-judge panel of the appellate court to turn down Leong's appeal.

=== Plea for clemency from the President ===
After failing to have his appeal reheard, Leong's final recourse was to appeal to the President of Singapore for clemency, which would allow Leong's death sentence be commuted to life imprisonment if successful.

At that time in Singapore, it was considered extremely rare for death row inmates to be pardoned from execution by the President of Singapore, since there were only six people who were spared the gallows despite committing murder and capital drug trafficking. The last time such a pardon was granted was in April 1998, when 19-year-old Mathavakannan Kalimuthu, who murdered a gangster in May 1996, had his death sentence revoked by then President Ong Teng Cheong, which allowed Mathavakannan to be incarcerated for life instead. Mathavakannan was eventually released from prison on parole in 2012, after he served his life sentence with good behaviour.

On 28 November 2007, The Straits Times reported that President S. R. Nathan rejected Leong's plea for clemency. Soon after this outcome, a death warrant was issued and it ordered that Leong's execution should be carried out two days later on the Friday morning of 30 November 2007.

== Execution ==
During the final days before his client's execution, Subhas Anandan and his assistant Sunil Sudheesan went to visit Leong for one last time in Changi Prison. Anandan said that during his visit, Leong was calm and relaxed, and was prepared to meet his fate. He expressed his gratitude to Anandan and Sunil for giving his best to defend him in his trial. Anandan described his client as philosophical as Leong considered his execution as a predestined fate and there was nothing he or they could do to avert it.

While in prison, Leong was said to have gained a lot of weight as he spent his days awaiting his hanging. He also reportedly became friends with fellow prisoner Tan Chor Jin, a triad leader of Ang Soon Tong who was on death row for robbing and shooting his former acquaintance and nightclub owner Lim Hock Soon to death in 2006. Tan was coincidentally a former client of Leong's lawyer Subhas Anandan, who represented Tan in his appeal hearing and clemency petition. Tan was executed more than a year later on 9 January 2009.

On 30 November 2007, Leong Siew Chor was hanged in Changi Prison at dawn, aged 52.

== Aftermath ==
=== Expert opinion ===
The Kallang body parts case left a deep impression on all the people involved in the case and investigation.

In an interview conducted by the producers of the documentary Anatomy of a Crime, Dr Teo Eng Swee expressed his sympathy for the terrible plight and end which Liu Hong Mei met, given that she was just a young lady who came to Singapore from another country with hopes of earning a better life for herself and her family. Dr Teo also personally revealed his own pondering about what are exactly the thoughts that flashed through the mind of someone like Leong Siew Chor, who was in an intimate relationship with another person, which led to him ruthlessly taken the life of the person he was intimate with and dismembering her body. Dr Teo also confessed that the way of dismemberment in this case was quite revolting and gruesome, which could frighten even the most hardened of pathologists.

In another interview, Inspector Lim offered his sympathy and condolences to the victim and her family. Lim additionally expressed some sympathy to Leong despite his crime, stating that Leong himself was originally a devoted father who was hard-working and law-abiding, but due to one mistake, which was his decision to kill Liu, it had not only irrevocably shattered the lives of his family members, but he also paid the ultimate price for his crime.

Subhas Anandan, Leong's former lawyer, wrote about the murder case in his autobiography The Best I Could. In his memoir, Anandan raised his suspicions that Leong might have killed Liu for other reasons, because Leong had a stable income and was not short of cash, and it was strange that he stole Liu's cards. He should have begged for forgiveness from her should she really found out that he was the culprit, and need not to resort to such an extreme measure of ending her life. When he asked his client about this, Leong only replied, “I suppose it’s greed.”

This strange reply did not satisfy Anandan's unanswered questions regarding Leong's true motive. Regardless, the lawyer expressed his sympathy for Leong's family, who suffered a lot and underwent public ostracization throughout the time he stood trial and even considered Leong's children as very good children. He also said that it was always the case for the families whenever one of their relatives was involved in a murder case, and he criticized those criminals, including Leong, for being selfish and not thinking of their families whenever they committed the crimes. The lawyer also admitted to some degree of horror he felt over the gruesome nature of the case, as he had seen the 280 photographs of the dismembered body parts presented at the trial. Anandan said that as a result of the case, some members of the public, and his own kin - including his then teenage son and elder sister - had reprimanded him for representing a cold-blooded killer like Leong.

In a 2022 crime documentary Inside Crime Scene, Sunil Sudheesan, Anandan's nephew and junior lawyer, admitted in his interview that during his first meeting with Leong, he never expected that an ordinary "uncle" like Leong would commit such a brutal crime, and he described Leong as a soft-spoken and gentle person. Sudheesan stated that, on the day Leong demonstrated to the court how he strangled Liu, after he went home, Sudheesan's mother and her family, who are of Chinese descent, asked him to use flower water to bathe himself, hoping to help him get rid of bad luck. Sudheesan also said that from what he observed, Leong did not show strong signs of remorse, arrogance or anger for his crime, and he was calm throughout the court proceedings.

Sudheesan stated that on the day Leong Siew Chor was sentenced to death, it was a sombre day to him as everyone in the court was told to stand up before Justice Tay Yong Kwang pronounced the death penalty on Leong. He described Leong's family as nice people and they remained supportive of him throughout the trial, and he felt it was a heartbreaking scene as he saw Leong and his family conversing in court shortly after the appeal's dismissal. Sudheesan recalled that during the final days of his life before his execution, Leong agreed to donate his organs to other people, and as a last act of kindness in his life, Leong shared his last meal together with the other death row inmates on the final day before his execution.

Forensic experts were also called in for interview in the same show as Sudheesan; they opined that the psychological motivations behind Leong's decision to dismember Liu Hong Mei's corpse were of practical purposes, given that Singapore was a small country and with high surveillance all over the country, it was difficult for Leong to be able to effectively dispose of the body in a suitable location, leading to the dismemberment. They also stated that a mild-mannered person like Leong could become a murderer should he be overcome with emotive thoughts and violence. Also, undertaker Roland Tay, and Leong's 54-year-old former colleague Fu Ru Cheng, were both interviewed in the episode. Both Tay and Fu stated their sympathy towards the plight of Liu and the manner of her death. Additionally, in another unrelated interview in 2018, Fu, who was a former suspect of the Kallang body parts case before Leong's arrest and confession, stated that Liu was a kind and gentle person, a fact which he reiterated four years later in his 2022 interview. Fu also revealed that during the time he was considered as a murder suspect, many people treated him with contempt and thought he was the killer since he was the youngest of Liu's three supervisors back then.

=== In the media ===
The Kallang River murder case was re-enacted in a Singaporean factual programme Crimewatch. It first aired as the ninth episode of the show's annual season in November 2006. It was re-enacted five months after Leong was sentenced to death, and a year before he was executed, and is available on meWATCH. The case was also filmed as an episode of a crime documentary series titled Anatomy of a Crime, which was broadcast on television in 2012, and currently viewable via Dailymotion.

This case was also recorded in Subhas Anandan's memoir The Best I Could, which features his early life, career and his notable cases. The memoir was adapted into a TV show of the same name, which runs for two seasons. Leong's case was re-enacted and aired as the fourth episode of the show's first season, though some aspects of the case were altered for dramatic purposes. For instance, Leong was portrayed to be younger and more plump than his real-life counterpart, and he was not balding at all. The manner of his arrest and him butchering Liu's body also differed greatly from the real-life details, and even his adult children were portrayed as young school-going kids in this re-enactment. It is currently viewable via meWATCH.

In July 2015, Singapore's national daily newspaper The Straits Times published a e-book titled Guilty As Charged: 25 Crimes That Have Shaken Singapore Since 1965, which included the case of Leong Siew Chor as one of the top 25 crimes that shocked the nation since its independence in 1965. The book was borne out of collaboration between the Singapore Police Force and the newspaper itself. The e-book was edited by ST News Associate editor Abdul Hafiz bin Abdul Samad. The paperback edition of the book was published and first hit bookshelves in June 2017. The paperback edition first entered the ST bestseller list on 8 August 2017, a month after publication.

Australian crime writer Liz Porter wrote a book titled Crime Scene Asia: When Forensic Evidence Becomes the Silent Witness. The book encompasses the real-life murder cases from Asia that were solved through forensic evidence; these recorded cases came from Asian countries such as Singapore, Malaysia and Hong Kong. Liu's murder was one of the 16 murder cases from Asia which Porter included in her book.

A 2021 article from The Smart Local named the case of Liu Hong Mei's murder as one of the 9 most terrible crimes that brought shock to Singapore in the 2000s.

In 2022, another Singaporean programme, titled Inside Crime Scene, also re-enacted the case and aired the adaptation as its third episode.

== Similar cases ==
The case recalled several murders in Singapore where the victims were also dismembered post mortem. One of them was the case of John Martin Scripps, a British serial killer who murdered and dismembered a South African tourist Gerard George Lowe in a hotel in Singapore. The killer disposed of Lowe's body parts in the nearby ocean. Scripps was hanged in Singapore's Changi Prison in 1996 for Lowe's murder. Another case was Sim Joo Keow, who killed and dismembered her sister-in-law Quek Lee Eng in 1974 over a tontine-related money dispute and hid Quek's body parts in her home's earthen jars. Sim served ten years in prison for culpable homicide instead of murder, as well as hiding evidence.

The case of Liu Hong Mei's murder was also recalled in subsequent murder cases that involved dismembered body parts in Singapore. The Orchard Road body parts murder, which occurred merely three months after Leong murdered Liu, involved Filipino maid Guen Garlejo Aguilar, who argued with her best friend Jane Parangan La Puebla over money and killed her out of a loss of self control, and quickly cut up her body into pieces to dispose at Orchard Road. As a result of her suffering from depression at the time of the crime, Aguilar was spared the death sentence and instead incarcerated for ten years for culpable homicide.

The murder of Indian national Jasvinder Kaur in 2013 was another case that recalled the Liu Hong Mei murder case. Jasvinder, a 33-year-old beautician, was allegedly murdered by her Indian-born husband and senior logistics coordinator Harvinder Singh (aged 33 in 2013), who dismembered her corpse and disposed of her body parts in a canal at McNair Road. Although her head and hands were never found, she was identified after DNA tests were made between the body parts and her belongings. Harvinder, who fled Singapore hours before the discovery of his wife's murder, was placed among the most wanted suspects on Interpol’s wanted list. Harvinder's friend, 25-year-old Gursharan Singh, who assisted Harvinder to dispose the evidence of Jasvinder's murder and her body parts, was jailed for 30 months for failing to report the crime to the police. In July 2015, a coroner's report found Harvinder guilty of the murder of his wife, as it was a well-organized crime and unlikely a crime of passion. As of today, Harvinder remains at large.

In June 2014, the legless body of 59-year-old Pakistani national Muhammad Noor was found inside an abandoned luggage placed alongside the road. After the luggage was found by an 81-year-old man and the matter reported to the police, the investigations of the case led to Muhammad's two roommates Rasheed Muhammad and Ramzan Rizwan, both of whom also came from Pakistan, being arrested, charged, and sentenced to death on 17 February 2017 for killing Muhammad over the money they lost to him in a game of cards. Liu Hong Mei's case was recalled due to its similar gruesome nature of the dismemberment of the corpse.

== See also ==
- Capital punishment in Singapore
- List of major crimes in Singapore
- Subhas Anandan
- John Martin Scripps
- Murder of Muhammad Noor
