= Orchard Road body parts murder =

2005 murder and dismemberment of a Filipino maid in Singapore

Jane Parangan La Puebla
- Jane Parangan La Puebla, the 26-year-old murdered maid
- Born: Jane Parangan La Puebla c. 1979; Bagabag, Nueva Vizcaya, Philippines
- Died: 7 September 2005 (aged 26); Singapore
- Cause of death: Murdered by strangulation
- Occupation: Domestic maid
- Known for: Murder victim
- Spouse: Crusaldo La Puebla
- Children: 1 son

On 7 September 2005, in Serangoon, Singapore, 29-year-old Filipino maid Guen Garlejo Aguilar murdered her 26-year-old compatriot and best friend Jane Parangan La Puebla by strangulation, after the two women got into a heated quarrel over a S$2,000 debt La Puebla owed Aguilar. After the killing, Aguilar hid the body for two days before she dismembered it and abandoned the two bags containing La Puebla's body parts at Orchard Road and MacRitchie Reservoir. Aguilar was arrested twelve hours after the discovery of the body parts by passers-by in these two locations. Originally charged with murder, Aguilar, who suffered from depression at the time of the offence, managed to avoid the death penalty after she pleaded guilty and received a sentence of ten years' in jail for a reduced charge of manslaughter.

== Discovery of body parts ==
On the afternoon of 9 September 2005 at 1 pm, 41-year-old Malaysian cleaner Maria Yee Marutham was doing her work when she found a sports bag nearby a mosaic wall outside Orchard MRT station. As Maria searched the bag, she discovered the severed head of a young woman, as well as the severed arms and legs packed in two separate black trash bags. Five hours after the horrific discovery, in the evening of the same day at 6 pm, a 41-year-old civil servant named Alvin Lim Seng Leong made another grisly discovery when he chanced upon a black trolley bag at MacRitchie Reservoir, and the bag itself contained the torso of a woman.

The police were informed of the two discoveries of body parts in both Orchard Road and the reservoir, and the disposal of these body parts at two openly public spaces had baffled the police investigators. Based on investigations and the forensic examinations of Dr Wee Keng Poh, the senior forensic pathologist of the Health Sciences Authority, the body parts found at these two different places belonged to the same person. Fingerprints recovered from the hands enabled the police to identify the victim, who was a 26-year-old Filipino maid named Jane Parangan La Puebla, who was reported missing by her employer a day before the discovery of her dismembered corpse. The case of her death, according to Dr Wee's report, was strangulation, as there were bruises found on the neck of the deceased.

At the time of her death, La Puebla was married and had a nine-year-old son, and her mother was still alive. Her father, a soldier, died in Patikul, Jolo when she was three years old, and hence both La Puebla and a sister was raised by her father's relatives in her hometown at Bagabag, the Philippines.

== Investigation and arrest ==
The police classified the case as murder, and they swiftly investigated the death of La Puebla. Based on the torn newspaper pages wrapped around the severed body parts, the police discovered a bearing the name and address of an Indian immigrant living in a condominium at Serangoon.

The police managed to trace the address, and they arrived at the condominium, where the Indian man and his wife, as well as their maid resided in. Soon after the police's arrival, the household's Filipino maid Guen Garlejo Aguilar, who was the best friend of the victim, was arrested on 10 September 2005, twelve hours after the body parts were discovered. The 29-year-old Filipino maid was charged with murder the next day. The police suspected Aguilar had killed La Puebla inside the condominium before dismembering her, and a 18 cm meat cleaver was also retrieved as evidence. At the time of her arrest, Aguilar was married with two sons, and was a resident of Ilocos Sur, Northern Luzon back in the Philippines. Her husband Edwin Aguilar and relatives rushed to Singapore upon receiving news of Aguilar's arrest for the grisly murder, which made headlines in both Singapore and the Philippines and shocked both countries at that time. It happened so that three months before in the same year of 2005, another high-profile murder and dismemberment case happened at Singapore's Kallang, where 50-year-old Leong Siew Chor strangled his 22-year-old Chinese girlfriend Liu Hong Mei and butchered the corpse into seven pieces. Leong was sentenced to death and hanged for the cold-blooded murder on 30 November 2007 after a highly reported 16-day trial. Many people suspected the Orchard Road murder to be a copy-cat of the Kallang River body parts murder, and compared the coincidental similarities between both cases, including the birthdays of the killers (both born on 19 April but of different years) in these two cases.

Aguilar was ordered on 23 September to undergo psychiatric evaluation while in remand facing trial for murder. These tests were completed in October 2005. Criminal lawyer Shashi Nathan was engaged to defend Aguilar during her upcoming trial.

There were fears from the Filipino public and government that Aguilar would be put to death for murder in Singapore (since murder was punishable by death in the city-state), because back on 17 March 1995, a Filipino maid named Flor Contemplacion was hanged in Changi Prison for murdering a four-year-old boy and another Filipino maid. The execution of Contemplacion for the double murders sparked protests from the Filipino public and severely damaged the democratic ties between Singapore and the Philippines. Singaporean officials reassured that Aguilar had been receiving fair treatment by the Singapore authorities and Philippine Ambassador Belen Anota advised the Filipino public and media to not recklessly report or speculate on the case and add sensation to the case, and it was added that they should allow the law to run its course and sent a reminder that any Filipinos in Singapore should abide by the country's laws and regulations. Representatives from the Filipino government were also sent to lend support for Aguilar during the court proceedings.

The case itself was also shocking to Aguilar's employers, who reportedly experienced sleepless nights since the murder took place at their home, and they contemplated the possibility of moving out.

The body of Jane Parangan La Puebla was flown back to the Philippines on 25 September 2005 after the completion of forensic examinations, and her family retrieved it for burial. Buddhist monks were also invited to make final prayers and rituals for La Puebla at the Orchard Road area where her body parts were found.

== Aguilar's confession ==
Guen Garlejo Aguilar
- Born: 19 April 1976; Tagudin, Ilocos Sur, Philippines
- Status: Released from Changi Women's Prison
- Conviction: Culpable homicide not amounting to murder (one count)
- Penalty: Ten years' imprisonment

Details
- Victims: 1
- Date: 7–9 September 2005
- Country: Singapore
- Date apprehended: 9 September 2005

The following account was Aguilar's version of the events that happened leading up to the murder of La Puebla and dismemberment of the corpse.

Aguilar, who first came to Singapore in 2001 to work as a maid, befriended La Puebla, whom she met in Singapore, and both women became close friends, and they treated each other as sisters. However, on the day of the murder, both were in a heated argument over a debt of S$2,000 which La Puebla owed to her. Half of the money was forked out from Aguilar's personal savings to help La Puebla to settle some of her financial troubles back home, while the other half came from a third Filipino maid (acquainted with both Aguilar and La Puebla), who borrowed it from a Singaporean loanshark and Aguilar had to pay the loan back with an interest of 20%. This pressure to discharge her debt greatly distressed Aguilar.

On the day of the murder, both women were at Aguilar's employers' home to discuss on the repayment of the debt, but when Aguilar suggested to La Puebla that she sold her video and digital cameras to pay off the debt, La Puebla became agitated and raised her voice. It thus led to a quarrel between both women, and they fought each other as the argument grew fiercer, with Aguilar biting the arm of La Puebla during the fight; the bite wound and teeth marks on La Puebla's severed right arm matched to the teeth of Aguilar and her dental records. During the fight, Aguilar used a pillow to cover La Puebla's face and smothered her until she fell unconscious. Afterwards, Aguilar released the pillow and La Puebla suddenly regained consciousness, which caused Aguilar to strangle La Puebla until she stopped breathing and died from the suffocation.

After the murder of La Puebla, Aguilar hid the body in her room, inside a luggage bag. Two days after killing La Puebla, on 9 September, while her employers were not at home, Aguilar went to Little India, where she bought a chopper, an axe, gloves and black rubbish bags from Mustafa Shopping Centre, and returned to the condominium to disarticulate La Puebla's corpse. Aguilar also replaced her bolster, two pillowcases, new curtains and a bedsheet to replace the blood-stained bedsheets and curtains inside her room, and used detergent and water to clean her room. She spent the morning to dismember the corpse before packing them in newspapers, plastic bags and rubbish bags and kept them in two different bags, which she disposed of at both Orchard Road and MacRitchie Reservoir, where they were eventually discovered and also led to Aguilar's arrest.

== Trial and sentencing ==
Before her trial, Aguilar's murder charge with respect to the killing of La Puebla was reduced to one of culpable homicide not amounting to murder (or manslaughter), which effectively meant that Aguilar would no longer face the death penalty even if found guilty of this reduced charge. Reasons behind the reduction was due to the psychiatric assessments by Dr Tommy Tan revealing that Aguilar suffered from depression, and it substantially impaired her mental faculties at the time when Aguilar was murdering La Puebla. The maximum sentence for culpable homicide not amounting to murder was life imprisonment, although the offence also warrant an alternative sentence of up to ten years' imprisonment. Aguilar's lawyer Shashi Nathan successfully sought the reduction of the murder charge through his representations to the Attorney-General's Chambers on the behalf of his client, who pleaded guilty to the charge on 18 May 2005 at the High Court, with the verdict on sentence scheduled to be given eleven days later.

On 29 May 2006, after hearing the submissions from the defence and prosecution, Justice V K Rajah, the trial judge presiding over Aguilar's case, delivered his verdict. Although he considered the options between a life sentence and the other sentencing option of ten years or below, he found that Aguilar's culpability and conduct was not deserving of a harsh sentence like life imprisonment (which the prosecution did not seek before sentencing), as he noted that while in prison, Aguilar's psychiatric condition, which appeared to be compounded by her financial woes, had shown a significant improvement and she had strong familial support and she also had a low-risk of re-offending based on reports by the psychiatrist Tommy Tan. Justice Rajah also noted that while Aguilar's conduct was "grotesque and abominable", her decision to abandon the body parts outright in two different public spaces was "incoherent and incomprehensible", and the workings of "a tortured mind".

Therefore, based on the above mitigating factors and circumstances leading up to the crime, Justice Rajah sentenced 30-year-old Guen Garlejo Aguilar to ten years' imprisonment, with the sentence backdated to the date of her arrest.

== Aftermath ==
After her trial, Aguilar served her sentence at Changi Women's Prison, with her sentence backdated to the date of her arrest on 10 September 2005. She was released since September 2015.

When he was interviewed sixteen years later in February 2022 about the case, Aguilar's former lawyer Shashi Nathan stated that while he handled the former maid's case, he had to ignore the sensational aspects and speculations behind the case to seek the best efforts to defend Aguilar and gather up evidence in order to support the case that Aguilar's killing of La Puebla was due to a sudden fight and other circumstances that did not support the charge of murder against her.

During the time while Aguilar was still imprisoned behind bars, Singaporean crime show Crimewatch re-enacted the Orchard Road body parts murder. It first aired as the fifth episode of the show's annual season in July 2006. It is currently available on meWATCH.

In July 2015, Singapore's national daily newspaper The Straits Times published a e-book titled Guilty As Charged: 25 Crimes That Have Shaken Singapore Since 1965, which included the Orchard Road body parts murder as one of the top 25 crimes that shocked the nation since its independence in 1965. The book was borne out of collaboration between the Singapore Police Force and the newspaper itself. The e-book was edited by ST News Associate editor Abdul Hafiz bin Abdul Samad. The paperback edition of the book was published and first hit bookshelves in June 2017. The paperback edition first entered the ST bestseller list on 8 August 2017, a month after publication.

== See also ==
- Capital punishment in Singapore
- Life imprisonment in Singapore
- Kallang River body parts murder
- Murder of Muhammad Noor
- John Martin Scripps
