= Murder of Muhammad Noor =

2014 dismemberment and murder case of a Pakistani in Singapore

Muhammad Noor
- 59-year-old Muhammad Noor, whose legless body was found inside a luggage
- Born: Muhammad Noor c. 1955; Pakistan
- Died: 11 June 2014 (aged 59); Rowell Road, Singapore
- Cause of death: Murdered by smothering
- Occupation: Tissue paper seller
- Known for: Murder victim

On 11 June 2014, 59-year-old Muhammad Noor, a Pakistani tissue paper seller, was murdered by his two compatriots Rasheed Muhammad (43 years old) and Ramzan Rizwan (25 years old), who both smothered him to death and robbed him of S$6,000, after they lost their own money to Muhammad over a game of cards.

Afterwards, Muhammad's corpse was dismembered by the two men using a saw, and his severed legs were packed in a luggage while his upper body was kept in another luggage. The second luggage containing Muhammad's legless body was later found abandoned at a roadside by an 81-year-old man and this discovery was reported to the police, who swiftly arrested the pair for their crime the day after Muhammad's murder. The first luggage containing the severed legs were later found at a Muslim cemetery in Jalan Kubor. The grisly killing and subsequent dismemberment of Muhammad brought shock to the whole of Singapore back in 2014.

Although both Rasheed and Ramzan pinned the blame on one another for murdering Muhammad during their joint murder trial, the High Court nonetheless rejected their claims and deemed that both defendants were responsible for the premeditated murder and gruesome dismemberment of Muhammad and hence, both Ramzan and Rasheed were convicted as charged and sentenced to death after a five-day trial on 17 February 2017. They were eventually hanged sometime in 2018.

== Discovery of legless body ==
On the evening of 11 June 2014, at Syed Alwi Road in Little India, 81-year-old Tan Tin Loke, a karang guni man (or rag-and-bone man) discovered a grey luggage abandoned at the roadside, and placed it in his trolley, before he continued with his usual routine of picking up cardboard and other reusable trash to sell. But Tan struggled to move the bag, and several passers-by approached to help him. However, it led to them discovering blood flowing out of the luggage and one of the passers-by, 57-year-old cleaner Woo Shin Kwong, reported the matter to the police.

The police arrived after receiving the report, and they opened up the luggage, and they found the body of a man stuffed inside the luggage. However, the legs were missing and believed to have been dismembered from the body. Deputy Superintendent of Police (DSP) Roy Lim led the investigations into the case, which was classified as murder. The murdered man was identified as 59-year-old Pakistani national Muhammad Noor, who came from Pakistan to Singapore the previous month to sell tissue paper.

The case itself recalled several other high-profile cases of murder where the victim(s) was killed and dismembered, including the Kallang River body parts murder of 2005, the 2005 Orchard Road body parts murder and the British serial killer John Martin Scripps who killed and butchered a South African tourist in 1995 at a hotel in Singapore.

== Arrest and investigations ==
After the police took over the investigations, they checked with shops nearby the area Muhammad Noor was found. They recovered the CCTV footage and statements from some shop owners that there were one or two men came to buy two luggages, trash bags, an electric saw and a manual saw. It was deduced that the killer(s) responsible for Muhammad's murder were foreigners and could be staying nearby at Rowell Road, as they were frequently spotted at that area.

The next day, the police went to several lodging houses to search and interview the owners. One of them, Neeraj Chandna, who co-owned an unnamed lodging house, was approached by police and he identified the two men as his tenants, 43-year-old Rasheed Muhammad and 25-year-old Ramzan Rizwan. The police thus arrested the two men, and they were later charged with murder. With the help of forensic and fingerprint technology, the fingerprints on the recovered luggage and trash bag were matched to those of the suspects.

Both Rasheed and Ramzan, like Muhammad, were also Pakistani citizens who came to Singapore on social visit passes in May 2014 to sell tissue paper like Muhammad. Rasheed, who shared the same room with Muhammad, was married with eight children and wanted to earn money in Singapore to marry off his daughters, while Ramzan himself was married with three children. Both suspects were friends and were also distant relatives, and they both came from the same village as the victim Muhammad Noor back in Pakistan.

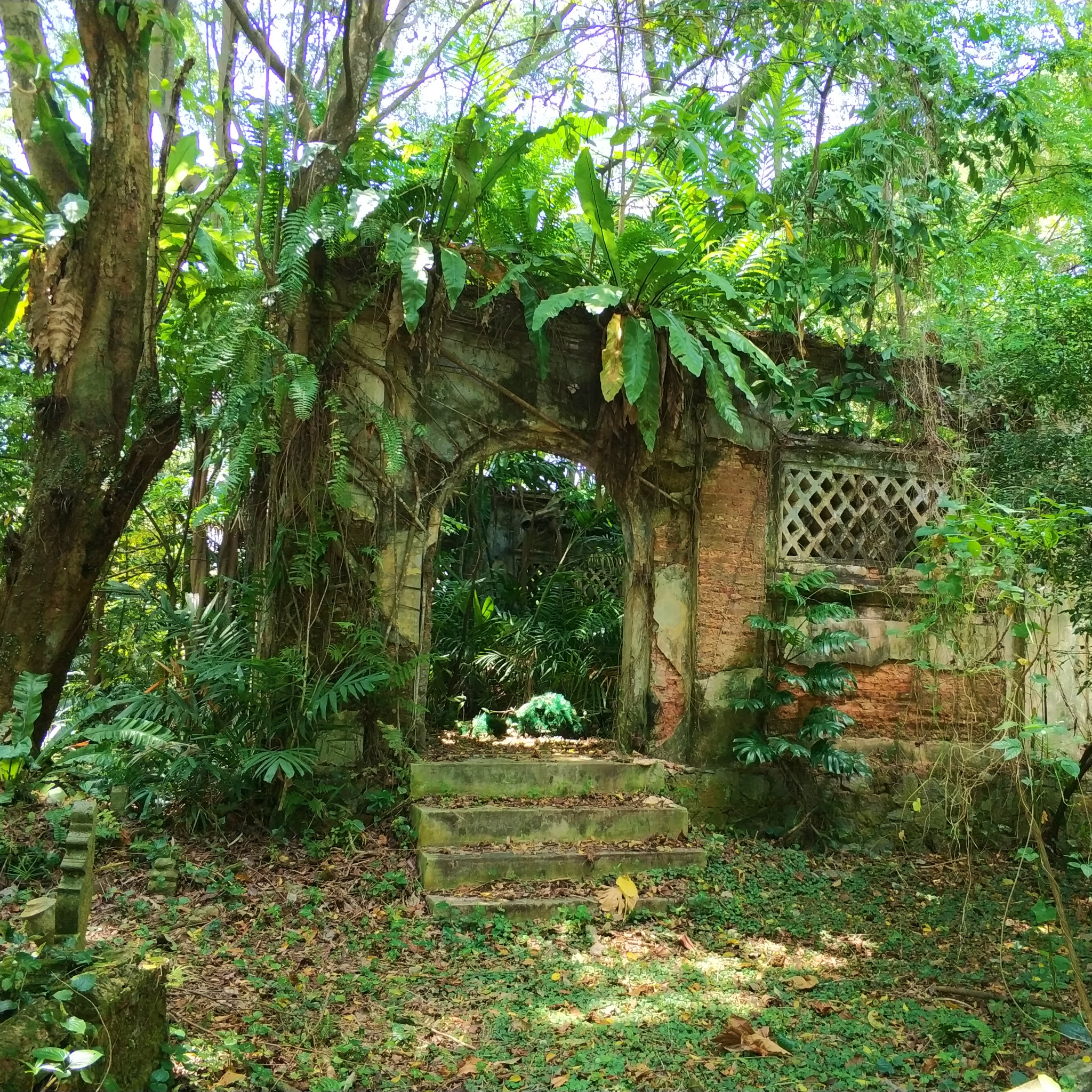
Jalan Kubor cemetery, where the severed legs of Muhammad were recovered.

Subsequently, after their arrests, one of the suspects Rasheed led the police to Jalan Kubor Muslim Cemetery, where they recovered a smaller luggage that contained the severed legs of Muhammad and a saw. Rasheed and Ramzan were brought back to the crime scene to re-enact the crime. Subsequently, both Rasheed and Ramzan were remanded for psychiatric assessment and were eventually found fit to plead and stand trial. Ramzan was reported to have attempted suicide while in prison awaiting trial.

The body of Muhammad was later flown back to Pakistan after his family recovered the corpse for burial at their hometown, and the Pakistani High Commission not only rendered assistance to the victim's bereaved kin, they also stated that they would help ensure legal representation for the two suspects in the upcoming murder trial.

According to Neeraj, the owner of the lodging house where the murder took place, he commented that the case itself had caused most of his tenants to move out of the house due to the negative publicity surrounding the gruesome murder case.

== Murder trial ==
=== Prosecution's case ===
Rasheed Muhammad

Ramzan Rizwan

On 8 November 2016, both Ramzan Rizwan and Rasheed Muhammad stood trial at the High Court for the murder of Muhammad Noor, with R S Bajwa and Wong Siew Hong representing Ramzan and Rasheed respectively. Ong Luan Tze was the trial prosecutor of the case, and High Court Judge Choo Han Teck presided the trial hearing of the case.

The prosecution charged that both men shared the common intention to murder Muhammad with the intention of causing his death, and with the motive to commit robbery. According to the men's statements to the police, both Rasheed and Ramzan engaged in a game of cards with Muhammad, and both men lost their money to Muhammad during the gambling session, and while they blamed each other for the killing, it was pieced together that Muhammad died after he was strangled with a string and had his face and mouth covered with a shirt. Dr Gilbert Lau, a forensic pathologist who conducted the autopsy on the victim, testified that there were extensive bruises on the face of Muhammad, while there were neck bruises that were caused by strangulation with a string. However, Dr Lau stated that the neck injuries were not fatal, and instead, the bruises on the face showed that the cause of death was consistent with smothering, since no blood clots were seen at the neck region where the strangulation occurred.

The prosecution also produced evidence of the CCTV footages which showed both men buying the saws and luggages they used to dismember and dispose of the corpse. Based on the men's earlier statements, it was revealed that after dismembering the body, Ramzan first pulled the smaller luggage that contain the legs of Muhammad and threw it at Jalan Kubor Muslim cemetery, before he returned to help Rasheed pull the bigger luggage that contained the upper torso of Muhammad. However, after pulling it for some distance, there was blood leaking out of the luggage, and the two men were forced to simply leave it behind at the roadside after noticing it. That roadside was the same place where the 81-year-old karang guni man Tan Tin Loke discovered it and picked it up without knowing it contained the dead body of Muhammad.

=== Defences of Rasheed and Ramzan ===
Rasheed and Ramzan both denied that they were the ones who killed Muhammad Noor, and pinpoint each other as the one who killed Muhammad. Rasheed, who first took the stand, gave his account of what happened that night. He stated that prior to the killing, he gambled with Muhammad, with whom he was distantly related to, and lost a large sum of money but able to win back about S$200 to S$300. However, Ramzan totally lost his cash to Muhammad and therefore, he was boiling with rage and wanted to kill Muhammad and steal his money. Ramzan asked Rasheed to join him, but when Rasheed refused to, Ramzan further threatened Rasheed that he would harm his eight children and wife. Rasheed refused to help him kill Muhammad. Therefore, Rasheed joined in to lure Muhammad to his room and both of them thus suffocated Muhammad by strangling him with a string and covered his face and mouth keep him silent. Rasheed admitted that he helped buy the luggages and both the handsaw and electric saw to help dismember the body, but he blamed Ramzan for killing Muhammad.

On the other hand, Ramzan, who also elected to give his defence, blamed Rasheed as the sole person responsible for the killing. He testified that on that night itself, he was inside the room which Rasheed shared with Muhammad, and pleaded to Muhammad during their second round of gambling to return him the money he lost to Muhammad during the previous card game, but his plea was not accepted. In fact, Ramzan made similar requests to Muhammad a few days before the murder to return him the money but without success. According to Ramzan, Rasheed suddenly picked up a shirt and smothered the victim. He then asked Ramzan to hold onto the shirt, while he used a string to strangle the victim. Ramzan said that out of fear, he let go of the shirt and ran away from the room, and claimed that the last time he left the room, Muhammad was shouting and struggling and Rasheed was still inside the room, therefore he effectively blamed Rasheed for murdering 59-year-old Muhammad Noor.

== Trial verdict ==
On 17 February 2017, after a five-day trial, both 28-year-old Ramzan Rizwan and 46-year-old Rasheed Muhammad were found guilty of premeditated murder and sentenced to death by Justice Choo Han Teck.

Justice Choo stated that it was clear based on the evidence that both Rasheed and Ramzan shared the common intention to kill Muhammad Noor and to steal his money, since the evidence showed that they stole a total of S$6,000 in cash from Muhammad after his death. Ramzan was found with S$3,318 while Rasheed had S$5,745 on him, and Ramzan claimed he took S$1,100 from Muhammad after killing him. Justice Choo stated that from the looks of evidence, the dismemberment of Muhammad's corpse was more likely to have been committed by two people and not the work of a lone killer.

Justice Choo also pointed out that Rasheed's claims of being threatened to help Ramzan were not believable because Rasheed was 18 years older than Ramzan, so it cannot be possible for Rasheed to be threatened by someone younger than him. Besides, Rasheed's family was in Pakistan and thus far away from Ramzan's reach, and hence Ramzan's supposed threats to harm Rasheed's family would not come true. The judge also pointed out that should Rasheed have no intention to take part in the plot to kill Muhammad, he could have chosen to leave the room without joining in the attack on Muhammad. The demeanor and attitude of Rasheed and Ramzan was an obvious indication that Rasheed was more of a leader to Ramzan.

Also, Justice Choo dismissed Ramzan's claim that he was not in the room when the killing took place, given that there was no commotion heard from the room by other tenants, and if indeed Rasheed alone attacked Muhammad, the victim was bound to have fought back and noises could be heard, hence it was likely that the attack was conducted by two people. Justice Choo also found that based on Ramzan's admission that he covered Muhammad's mouth with a shirt and Rasheed's evidence of seeing Ramzan suffocating Muhammad with a shirt before he used the string, it was evident that Ramzan was the one who smothered Muhammad to death, which he commented was ironic given that their original plan was to strangle Muhammad with the string. The smothering of Muhammad, according to Justice Choo's judgement, was done in furtherance of the men's common intention to commit robbery and in turn, it caused Muhammad's death as they planned and intended to do.

As such, Justice Choo rejected the men's respective defences and recorded a guilty verdict of murder for both Rasheed and Ramzan. Given that the murder charge faced by the duo came under Section 300(a) of the Penal Code, which dictates an offence of murder with premeditation and intention to kill, the death penalty was the mandatory sentence available for this particular murder offence. They were not eligible for the alternative sentence of life imprisonment with caning given that the intention to kill was present in the murder offence charged.

After a disposal inquiry in March 2017, the S$1,100 which Ramzan stole from Muhammad was forfeited, leaving him with S$2,218. Although Rasheed sought to keep all the cash found on him and argued that the whole sum of money belonged to him, he managed to keep only S$845, as the High Court ordered S$4,900, the sum he stole from Muhammad, to be forfeited after finding that the S$4,900 rightfully belonged to the murdered victim.

== Aftermath ==
After their sentencing by the High Court, both Rasheed Muhammad and Ramzan Rizwan appealed against their convictions for Muhammad Noor's murder, and they raised the same defences and accounts they made during the trial. However, on 28 September 2017, the Court of Appeal dismissed both men's appeals and finalized their mandatory death sentences.

Both Rasheed and Ramzan were hanged in 2018, the following year after losing their appeals, and prison statistics confirmed that out of thirteen death row prisoners put to death by Singapore in 2018, two were executed for murder. In March 2018, the same year when the men were executed, Singaporean crime show Crimewatch re-enacted the case and investigations that led to the capture and conviction of the killers, and the re-enactment episode aired as the first episode of the show's annual season.

In June 2022, local writer Foo Siang Luen wrote the second volume of his real-life crime book Justice Is Done, which was published by the Singapore Police Force (including a digital download-for-free e-book version) 17 years after Foo wrote the first volume. The book recorded some of the gruesome murder cases encountered and solved by police throughout the years between 2005 and 2016, and the 2014 case of Muhammad Noor's murder and dismemberment was recorded as one of these cases covered in the book.

== See also ==
- John Martin Scripps
- Murder of Quek Lee Eng
- Kallang River body parts murder
- Orchard Road body parts murder
- Capital punishment in Singapore
