= Nur Mohammad, Hirmand =

Nur Mohammad نورمحمد
- Village
- Location within Iran
- Coordinates: 30°56′10″N 61°33′15″E
- Country: Iran
- Province: Sistan and Baluchestan
- County: Hirmand
- Bakhsh: Central
- Rural District: Jahanabad

Population (2006)
  - Total: 57
- Time zone: UTC+3:30 (IRST)
  - Summer (DST): UTC+4:30 (IRDT)

Nur Mohammad (Persian: نورمحمد, also Romanized as Nūr Moḩammad; also known as Deh-e Nūr Moḩammad-e Arghavānī) is a village in Jahanabad Rural District, in the Central District of Hirmand County, Sistan and Baluchestan Province, Iran. At the 2006 census, its population was 57, in 12 families.
