= Noor Muhammad Jadmani =

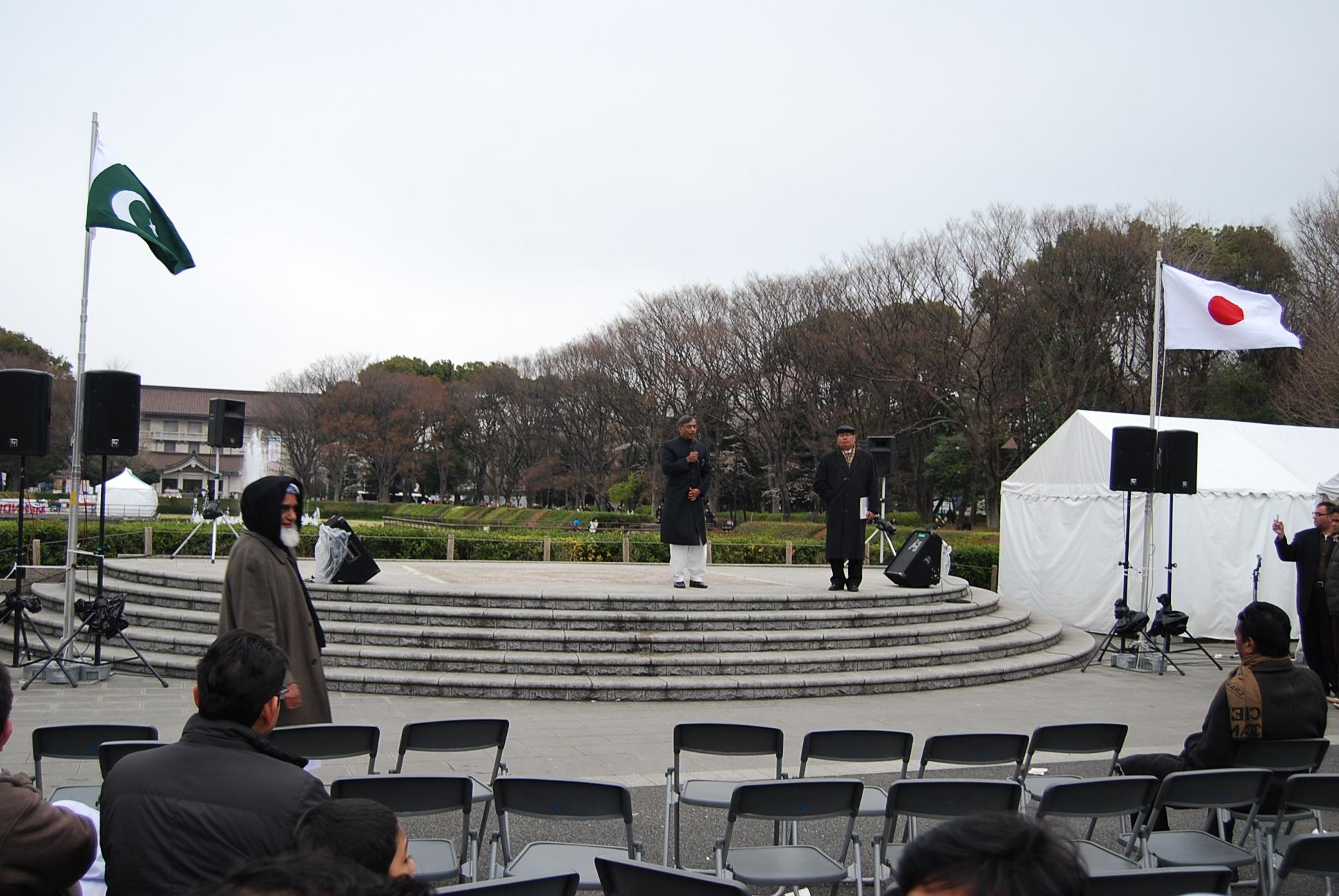
- Noor Muhammad addressing in a Pakistani festival in Ueno Park, Tokyo

Pakistan Ambassador to Japan
- In office 2009–2012
- President: Asif Ali Zardari
- Preceded by: Kamran Niaz
- Succeeded by: Farukh Akhter Amil

Pakistan Ambassador to Iran
- In office 2013–2016
- President: Asif Ali Zardari; Mamnoon Hussain
- Preceded by: Khalid Aziz Baber
- Succeeded by: Asif Durrani

Personal details
- Born: 1955 (age 70–71) Pakistan

Noor Muhammad Jadmani (Urdu: نور محمد جادمانی) is a retired officer of Foreign Service of Pakistan, who served at various ambassadorial positions for Pakistan. He also served as Chairman (SPSC) post-retirement for a period of five years; however, the High Court of Sindh has inculpated him for misconduct in the recruitment process during his tenure.

== Career ==
Noor joined the Ministry of Foreign Affairs of Pakistan in 1980. He has also worked as a representative of the United Nations in locations such as Kathmandu, Brussels, and Los Angeles. Besides, he also served as Chairman (SPSC). There had been allegations of administrative corruption and misconduct under Mr. Noor Muhammad Jadmani's chairmanship at the Sindh Public Service Commission (SPSC). The allegations reportedly pertain to irregularities and favoritism in the recruitment process, particularly in the 2020 Combined Competitive Examination (CCE) conducted by the commission.

Noor served as the Consul General of Pakistan, Los Angeles, since September 2003. He served as Counselor to the Embassy of Pakistan in Belgium from 2001 to 2003. He also served with the United Nations Transitional Administration in East Timor. In Islamabad, Consul General Jadmani held a range of high-ranking positions in the Ministry of Foreign Affairs, serving as Director of the Ministry from 1997 to 2000. Other postings have included Pakistan Permanent Mission to the United Nations and the Pakistani Embassy in Oman. Ambassador Jadmani joined the Foreign Service in 1980.

Noor served as the Ambassador to Japan from 2009 to 2012, and then the Ambassador to Iran from 2013 to 2016.

Noor Muhammad Jadmani served as the Chairman of the Sindh Public Service Commission from 2017 to 2022. He was appointed to the position for a period of five years with the approval of the Chief Minister of Sindh. During his tenure, the commission conducted various examinations and tests for recruitment to various posts in the provincial government. However, the commission's handling of the Combined Competitive Examination (CCE) in 2020 was called into question and led to a legal challenge. In February 2023, the Honourable High Court of Sindh ordered a fresh examination to be conducted and also directed departmental proceedings to be initiated against delinquent officials and officers, including Mr. Jadmani. As Mr. Jadmani's tenure had ended in March 2022, he was not subject to the departmental proceedings or inquiry under the Sindh Civil Servants (Efficiency and Discipline) Rules, 1973 or the West Pakistan Civil Services Pension Rules, 1963.The Chief Minister has approved seeking advice from the Law Department to recommend appropriate legal action against Mr. Jadmani, as he is no longer in service and his tenure as Chairman of the Sindh Public Service Commission ended in March 2022. The Law Department will provide recommendations on what legal action can be taken against Mr. Jadmani at this stage.
