= Nur Mohammad Bazar =

Nur Mohammad Bazar نور محمد بازار
- Village
- Location within Iran
- Coordinates: 25°28′00″N 61°03′00″E
- Country: Iran
- Province: Sistan and Baluchestan
- County: Chabahar
- Bakhsh: Central
- Rural District: Pir Sohrab

Population (2006)
  - Total: 135
- Time zone: UTC+3:30 (IRST)
  - Summer (DST): UTC+4:30 (IRDT)

Nur Mohammad Bazar (Persian: نور محمد بازار, also Romanized as Nūr Moḩammad Bāzār) is a village in Pir Sohrab Rural District, in the Central District of Chabahar County, Sistan and Baluchestan Province, Iran.

== Population ==
At the 2006 census, its population was 135, in 26 families.
