= Nur Mohammad-e Yusef Rudini =

Nur Mohammad-e Yusef Rudini نور محمد يوسف روديني
- Village
- Country: Iran
- Province: Sistan and Baluchestan
- County: Hirmand
- Bakhsh: Central
- Rural District: Dust Mohammad

Population (2006)
  - Total: 397
- Time zone: UTC+3:30 (IRST)
  - Summer (DST): UTC+4:30 (IRDT)

Nur Mohammad-e Yusef Rudini (Persian: نور محمد يوسف روديني, also Romanized as Nūr Moḩammad-e Yūsef Rūdīnī) is a village in Dust Mohammad Rural District, in the Central District of Hirmand County, Sistan and Baluchestan Province, Iran. At the 2006 census, its population was 397, in 84 families.
