= Nur Mohammad Dartakideh =

Nur Mohammad Dartakideh نورمحمددرتكيده
- Village
- Country: Iran
- Province: Sistan and Baluchestan
- County: Chabahar
- Bakhsh: Central
- Rural District: Pir Sohrab

Population (2006)
  - Total: 75
- Time zone: UTC+3:30 (IRST)
  - Summer (DST): UTC+4:30 (IRDT)

Nur Mohammad Dartakideh (Persian: نورمحمددرتكيده, also Romanized as Nūr Moḩammad Dartakīdeh) is a village in Pir Sohrab Rural District, in the Central District of Chabahar County, Sistan and Baluchestan Province, Iran. At the 2006 census, its population was 75, in 16 families.
