= Johannes van Damme =

Dutch drug trafficker executed in Singapore in 1994

- Born: 1 June 1935; Middelburg, Netherlands
- Died: 23 September 1994 (aged 59); Changi Prison, Singapore
- Citizenship: Dutch citizen
- Occupations: Engineer, businessman
- Status: Executed by hanging
- Conviction: Drug trafficking
- Penalty: Death

Johannes van Damme (1 June 1935 – 23 September 1994) was a Dutch engineer and businessman executed in Singapore for drug trafficking.

After purportedly being recruited to work as a courier for a Nigerian drug trafficking organization, van Damme was caught up in a D.E.A.-led international sting operation, which resulted in him being arrested while in possession of nearly 6 kilograms of high-quality heroin during a stopover in Singapore's Changi Airport.

Despite vehemently protesting his innocence and claiming he was tricked into smuggling narcotics, van Damme was found guilty at trial and sentenced to death. Singaporean authorities were undeterred by pleas for clemency from both the Dutch royal family and the government of the Netherlands. His sentence was carried out in 1994, and van Damme thus became the first European to be executed in Singapore since its independence.

== Early life ==
Van Damme was born and raised in Middelburg, a city located in the south west of the Netherlands. After graduating from the HTS Vlissingen in 1959, van Damme first worked as a technical engineer at the Kóni shock absorbers factory in Oud-Beijerland, then opened his own company in Hengelo, manufacturing bicycle parts, in the mid-1960s. Van Damme married and had two daughters while living in Hengelo; he also coached at the local swimming club his daughters attended in his spare time.

After his firm went out of business in 1976, van Damme began travelling to Nigeria on a regular basis to work as an agent for a local Dutch engineering company. In the early 1980s, van Damme's marriage broke down and he moved permanently to Nigeria. He married a local woman in Nigeria and had two children with her, as well as becoming step father to two other children from her previous relationship. He would later set up an import-export business specialising in computer hardware called 'Okwuafoka Nigeria Ltd' in Lagos with his second wife.

In 1990, van Damme was arrested in Haarlem for the possession of 10 kilograms (22 lb) of cannabis. On 14 February 1991, he was sentenced in absentia to ten weeks in jail, however he did not serve any time in prison as he was in Nigeria when the judgement was handed down.

== Background to arrest ==
=== American DEA investigation ===
In the late 1980s, American authorities estimated that Nigerian criminals controlled approximately 75 percent of heroin importation from overseas into the Baltimore-Washington area. In 1990, the US Drug Enforcement Administration (DEA) set up the Kodiac car brokerage firm in Baltimore, Maryland as a front company. As well as selling cars (often luxury vehicles) for cash to help launder the proceeds of drug dealing, the undercover DEA agents running the firm helped to transfer large amounts of money to foreign banks on behalf of local drug traffickers. The information gathered during these operations would then be used to help arrest drug offenders and used as evidence during their prosecution in court.

In October 1990, DEA agent Wilbert Lee Plummer (who was the undercover agent in charge of Kodiac) was introduced to a Washington, D.C.-based Nigerian national named Chidi Leon Eboh, who ran a drug smuggling network between Thailand and the United States of America. The syndicate would typically recruit African American couriers to travel to Singapore (although the gang was also active in Seoul and Manila) and await another drug mule to arrive from Bangkok with a shipment of heroin sourced from the Golden Triangle region. For internal security reasons, the two couriers never met each other and local members of the organization controlled the actual handover of the drugs in Singapore. After receiving the narcotics, the American courier would then travel on to Europe, and would be paid on average US$10,000 for smuggling 5 kilograms of heroin. Ironically, Singapore was a favored transit point due to its strict anti-drug laws, as the traffickers believed airport customs officers would be less vigilant in checking passengers arriving from the city state. According to DEA estimates at the time, one kilogram of heroin could be sold in America for a wholesale price of US$170,000 and would be worth over US$1 million by the time it was distributed at street dealing level.

In December 1990, DEA agent Plummer travelled to Singapore in order to collect 750 grams of heroin on behalf of the Baltimore gang and smuggle it back to the US. However, the Central Narcotics Bureau had been forewarned and had surveillance units monitoring the local gang members, who then moved in to arrest the suspects after the drugs had been handed over at the Dai-Ichi Hotel in Tanjong Pagar. DEA agent Plummer would later be the main witness for the prosecution against Nigerian nationals Gabriel Okonkwo and Paul Okechukwu Ngwudo during their trial for drug trafficking several years later. In March 1991, DEA agent Plummer transferred US$80,000 to a bank account in Bangkok for a 5 per cent commission fee on behalf of Leon, and would transfer cash on two further occasions to Bangkok-based accounts in the course of his investigations. DEA agent Plummer also purchased 100 grams of heroin from Leon for US$18,000 to build confidence with and embed himself further within the drug trafficking organization.

=== CNB surveillance in Singapore ===
On 13 August 1991, Leon asked DEA agent Plummer to send US$22,000 to a Singapore-based Nigerian national named John Obiefuna, on the understanding the money was to be used to fund the purchase of heroin from Thailand. DEA agent Plummer informed Singapore-based DEA agent Harry Fullett about the transaction, who then alerted the Central Narcotics Bureau of Singapore. Discovering Obiefuna was staying at the Westin Stamford Hotel on Stamford Road, the CNB bugged his hotel room and put him under 24-hour surveillance. On 22 August 1991, DEA agent Plummer wired the US$22,000 to Obiefuna's bank account as requested, and Obiefuna then moved out of the hotel to a rented apartment on Oxley Road. Obiefuna, who was on a 30-day social visit pass, subsequently registered a company whose nature of business was the import and export of children's clothing, and then applied for an employment pass to enable him to extend his stay in Singapore for up to two years.

On the night of 20 September 1991, undercover CNB agents observed Obiefuna appearing on the balcony of his apartment several times, as if he was expecting someone to arrive. Soon after, the agents spotted a European man emerge from a taxi on the same road. Obiefuna exited his apartment and walked down the street, and appeared to bump into the man. They talked for a short time, and then the European walked away to return to the nearby Lloyd's Inn hotel where he was staying. Subsequent investigations by the CNB agents identified the man as Dutch national Johannes van Damme.

Obiefuna and van Damme next met at a coffee shop, where undercover agents were waiting for them to arrive. A pair of agents disguised as American tourists sat beside the two men and started to record their surroundings on a video camera, thus capturing Obiefuna and van Damme speaking to each other on tape. One of the "tourists" then asked the pair if they could keep an eye on his bag for a few minutes while he and his friend recorded some footage of the street outside. Unknown to Obiefuna and van Damme, inside the bag was a hidden microphone and tape recorder, which captured their ensuing private conversation. Van Damme and Obiefuna discussed the details of their plan to have van Damme travel, first to Thailand then onwards to Europe, for a payment of US$20,000.

Van Damme subsequently booked a short package holiday in Phuket, and on arrival took a separate flight to Bangkok to collect a suitcase from Obiefuna's contacts. After receiving it, van Damme returned to Phuket on the same day and awaited his return flight to Singapore a few days later. Around the same time, C.N.B. officers cross referenced van Damme's name against airline passenger manifests for flights between Singapore and Thailand, and discovered he had boarded a flight to Phuket on the 22 September 1991 with a return flight due to arrive 5 days later.

== Arrest at Changi Airport ==
Van Damme was arrested on the afternoon of 27 September 1991 in the transit lounge of Singapore Changi Airport, after arriving from Phuket on a Tradewinds Airlines flight and awaiting a connecting flight via Swiss Air to Athens departing at 9:05pm that same evening. Alerted by a police sniffer dog, narcotics officers discovered a total of 5.79 kilograms (12.8 lb) of heroin hidden within two secret compartments of a suitcase belonging to him in the baggage area.

On the same day, 37 people were arrested by American federal agents, including eight in the Baltimore area, as the result the DEA's 18 month undercover investigation, with the defendants facing federal indictments relating to drug conspiracy & distribution, racketeering and money-laundering.

On 28 September 1991, van Damme was charged with the importation of the heroin discovered in his suitcase and then remanded in custody to await trial. On 12 October 1991, 38-year-old Obiefuna was arrested at his Oxley Garden apartment in connection with the heroin van Damme was caught with. He was later charged with abetting van Damme in importing the heroin and was scheduled to face joint trial with him.

== Trial ==
=== Opening statements ===
On 8 April 1993 in the High Court of Singapore, the opening statement of Deputy Public Prosecutor Ismail Hamid described how officers, acting on information received, had kept van Damme under surveillance after he arrived from Thailand that afternoon. He was followed from the airport's interline transfer counter to the transit lounge area, where he was then intercepted outside a toy shop. When asked if he had any other luggage apart from the cabin bag he was holding, van Damme claimed he did not; however, a suitcase belonging to him was thereafter located in the baggage area. The cabin bag and the suitcase were emptied of their contents and screened by sniffer dogs, who then made a positive reaction to the suitcase. Narcotics officers subsequently removed the lining of his suitcase and discovered two plastic bags containing a whiteish substance, which was later determined to be heroin. Both plastic bags were smeared with a dark paste on the outer layer that smelled of coffee powder in an effort to evade detection by sniffer dogs.

Giving evidence in his own defense, van Damme testified that he first met Obiefuna in the lobby of the Imperial Hotel in July 1991 and again at Lloyds Inn Hotel in August and September of that same year. Van Damme told the court that his reasons for visiting Singapore on all three occasions was to source computer hardware for a business centre he wished to set up in Nigeria, and that he specifically made the third trip in order to have a follow up meeting with a local businessman named 'Cyril Rodrigues'. Per van Damme's telling, at the September encounter at Lloyds Inn Hotel he mentioned to Obiefuna that he was going to Bangkok to meet fabric wholesalers. Obiefuna asked him to pick up a suitcase containing clothing while there, and bring it to Athens where someone would collect it on his behalf. Obiefuna then gave van Damme US$4,300 as spending money and a note with the name, address and phone number of a fellow Bangkok based Nigerian named 'Afonse', who was the person he was to retrieve the suitcase from. Van Damme attempted to collect the suitcase a few days later at the specified address as planned, however when he met Afonse at Juldis Tower in Ratchathewi he did not have it, and was instructed to collect it from another individual at the Royal Garden Hotel in Watthana instead.

Van Damme testified that when he opened the suitcase back at his hotel, he discovered it was empty, so he transferred the contents of his travel bag into it as he wanted it for his own use. Van Damme recalled that he had planned to contact Obiefuna to clarify the issue. He stated that he only realized it contained drugs after officers forced it open in the Central Narcotics Bureau office in Changi Airport and showed him the two packets of heroin concealed in the false bottom of the suitcase. Describing the moment the narcotics were discovered, van Damme testified "I was shocked because I was not aware anything was hidden in the suitcase ... I have never bought, sold or used drugs in my life". He added that he later confronted Obiefuna about the circumstances of his arrest while they were both on remand awaiting trial in Queenstown Remand Prison, however Obiefuna denied any knowledge of the heroin that was discovered in van Damme's luggage.

=== Legal challenge regarding "confession" ===
Van Damme also challenged the admissibility of a statement he gave to Central Narcotics Bureau Inspector William Chew Khai Chow over five different days between 30 September 1991 and 25 October 1991, where he confirmed he had prior knowledge about the concealed heroin in the suitcase and that he would be paid US$20,000 to transport it to Athens via commercial airline. Van Damme claimed he was told that the officers were not interested in him but in the syndicate the drugs belonged to, and that he hoped he "could go home after I helped them", which prompted him to incriminate himself by signing a statement admitting his guilt. Van Damme testified to the court that the US$20,000 he was to be paid in Athens was in fact offered by Obiefuna, because he wanted to be on the board of directors of a company he was going to set up in Holland, and was not a payment for transporting illegal drugs.

Van Damme asserted that the statement itself was recorded in a question-and-answer format, where he was only allowed to either agree or disagree with the accusations Inspector Chew put to him, and when van Damme demanded to speak to a superior officer on three separate occasions to complain about being forced to admit untrue facts in the statement, he was refused permission each time. When questioned by the judge, Inspector Chew denied insinuating to van Damme that he had known about the hidden drugs all along while recording his confession, adding that he did not suggest to van Damme that it was in his own interest to acknowledge his awareness of the concealed narcotics. Inspector Chew also denied that van Damme asked to lodge any sort of objection with his superiors regarding the manner in which his statement was being recorded or being coerced into admitting erroneous allegations within it. Inspector P. Senthilnathan testified that he interrogated van Damme on 28 September 1991 (the day after his arrest), where he had offered information voluntarily and not because Senthilnathan had deceived van Damme into believing Singaporean Police were only pursuing the drug trafficking organization he worked for rather than him personally.

Van Damme's defence lawyer Edmond Pereira countered that when detectives told him the Singaporean authorities were not interested in him, but they were focused on catching the masterminds behind the smuggling attempt instead, they had in effect induced him into agreeing with their "suggestions" during his interrogation, and since Inspector Chew had assured him that it was in van Damme's best interest to co-operate he thus told the detective whatever he wanted to hear. On 19 April 1993, Justice S. Rajendran ruled that van Damme's version of events regarding the recording of his original statement was probable. The judge agreed that the CNB's actions amounted to inducement, thereby rendering the entire statement recorded by the Central Narcotics Bureau as inadmissible. The judge therefore denied the prosecution's motion to admit van Damme's statements as inculpatory evidence.

=== Co-defendant acquitted ===
John Obiefuna being led from court

On 20 April 1993, Justice S. Rajendran ruled Obiefuna had no case to answer and acquitted him of all charges without calling him to give evidence in his own defence, citing lack of evidence to warrant a conviction. According to the prosecution, Central Narcotics Bureau officers originally had Obiefuna under surveillance for a number of months, as they suspected him of traveling to Singapore to recruit couriers on behalf of an international drug trafficking syndicate. They subsequently observed him talking to van Damme for about five minutes outside his Oxley Garden apartment on 20 September 1991. Apart from this, a piece of paper seized from van Damme with the name and Thai phone number of another Nigerian man and the Bangkok address where he collected the suitcase written on it, allegedly written by Obiefuna, was submitted as evidence. However, a Department of Scientific Services officer testified that there was insufficient similarity between it and samples of Obiefuna's handwriting for a positive identification to be made.

Defence lawyers for Obiefuna asserted that the main evidence presented against their client was van Damme's inadmissible confessions, and that the only physical evidence (the handwritten note) was proven in court to not be a positive match to his handwriting. They also highlighted how Obiefuna travelled to the city of Batam in Indonesia on 6 October 1991 and then returned the next day to Singapore, and questioned why he would not have taken the chance to flee the country if he was under threat of arrest for capital drug trafficking charges. Concurrently, authorities did not make an arrest to prevent him fleeing the jurisdiction or stop him for questioning.

=== Cross-examination by prosecutor ===
On 21 April 1993, van Damme was cross examined by Deputy Public Prosecutor Ismail Hamid about trips he made between July 1991 and September 1991. As well as the excursion that resulted in his arrest, he also traveled from Singapore to Bangkok then Vienna via Singapore and on to Zurich between 17 July and 11 August; then on 21 August he returned to Singapore before repeating the Bangkok to Zurich via Singapore trip again. Despite claiming he visited Singapore to source suppliers for a proposed communication center in Lagos, meet fabric wholesalers in Bangkok, and went to Vienna to shop for lace for his daughter's wedding dress, van Damme could not provide any documentary evidence to support his claims. When asked to produce corroborating evidence such as contracts, sales receipts or business cards, van Damme stated: "I never keep anything. When I've read a letter, I always throw it away".

The pattern of his travels was used to help back up the prosecution's assertions that van Damme was in fact a drug mule who was fully aware of the contents of the suitcase seized at Changi Airport, and had agreed to carry the heroin from Bangkok to Athens via Singapore for a payment of US$20,000. Prosecutor Hamid also reminded the court that when a sniffer dog reacted to van Damme's suitcase on the day he was arrested, he was observed to visibly tense up by witnesses at the scene, which would indicate he knew that illegal drugs were hidden inside. The Prosecutor likewise asserted that van Damme must have felt how strangely heavy the suitcase lid was when he opened it in the Bangkok hotel room.

"Mr Van Damme was unable or unwilling to answer anything clearly. I really don't necessarily want that man dead, as a prosecutor I do my job as best I can. To me this matter is as clear as day. The facts are rock solid and Van Damme cannot argue against them. Here in Singapore we are fair, but we have a law that no one should break. Certainly not drug legislation, because cocaine and heroin destroy our youth and disrupt our society. That is why we use the death penalty. Anyone who has been extremely wrong must pay extremely for it. With life."

— Deputy Public Prosecutor Ismail Hamid speaking to reporters after cross examining Van Damme

== Verdict ==
On 26 April 1993, van Damme was found guilty as charged and condemned to death for importing 4.32 kilograms of pure heroin into Singapore, contrary to Section 7 of the Misuse of Drugs Act. Justice S. Rajendran told van Damme in his oral judgement: "Having heard your evidence and having observed your demeanour and the way you testified in court, I have no doubt in my mind that you knew that there was a controlled drug concealed in the bag". The judge found many parts of van Damme's testimony "quite unsatisfactory", such as:

- Van Damme made three trips to Bangkok via Singapore from European cities between 17 July 1991 and 16 September 1991, for which he could not produce documentary evidence to adequately explain his innocent reasons for doing so.
- Van Damme asserted that his third trip to Singapore was specifically to meet a person named Cyril Rodrigues, however he was unable to give any details regarding Rodrigues' identity or even the particulars of the company he worked for.
- Van Damme asked for and received US$4,300 from Obiefuna for expenses, despite no agreement being in place regarding Obiefuna joining the future company van Damme would set up in Holland.
- Van Damme claimed to have never carried the suitcase personally, as he did not want to explain to the court how his suspicion was not aroused by the unusually heavy weight of the empty suitcase he received in Bangkok.
- Van Damme would have realized something was wrong when he opened the suitcase to check the contents and noticed how heavy its lid was from the extra concealed material it contained.

The judge added that given van Damme's mature age and wealth of life experiences, coupled with the fact he had only recently met Obiefuna, his explanation of innocently agreeing to transport a suitcase of clothes across the world on behalf of a group of strangers was both inconsistent and completely unbelievable. In his final remarks, Justice S. Rajendran stated: “You will be taken from here to the place of execution. There you will be hanged by the neck until death. May the Lord forgive you."

== Appeals ==
On 23 November 1993, the Court of Appeal dismissed van Damme's appeal against his conviction, ruling that the trial judge was correct in rejecting his defence that he was tricked by Obiefuna into carrying the heroin into Singapore in the false bottom of a suitcase. Defence lawyer Edmond Pereira had also argued that van Damme was in fact not in possession of the drugs, as the suitcase was under the control of the airline at all times until he arrived in Singapore, however this argument was also rejected by the appeal judges.

On 6 May 1994, van Damme petitioned the President of Singapore, Ong Teng Cheong, for clemency. Acting on the advice of Cabinet of Singapore, the President turned down the petition on 7 July 1994.

A plea for clemency from the Dutch government was rejected by the Singaporean authorities. A letter from Queen Beatrix of the Netherlands was also sent to the president in an unsuccessful attempt to prevent van Damme from being executed. The chairman of the European Union Council of Ministers, German Foreign Minister Klaus Kinkel, along with the President of the European Parliament, German MEP Klaus Hänsch, also made an unsuccessful appeal for clemency on behalf of the European Union.

"To: Her Majesty the Queen of the Netherlands - Your Majesty. A suppliant greets thee in almighty God's name! My dire straits and urgent need must have been made known to thee by His Excellency, the Prime Minister. My petition for clemency has been rejected by the President of the Republic of Singapore. A cruel manner of death, my portion is to be in the near future, unless your majesty intervenes and render me every assistance possible.... for I do not wish to die by execution in a foreign land for a crime I was never guilty of. I beseech 'Your Royal Highness' utmost endeavours: to save me from a cruel fate. Words do not suffice to phase my perilous predicament. I shall remember thee kindly before God's Throne of Grace. God bless thee and thine both richly and wonderfully. Your humble citizen, Johannes van Damme (Death Row Prison)."

— Van Damme's letter to Queen Beatrix asking her to intervene on his behalf

== International reactions ==
Van Damme's case attracted widespread public sympathy in his home country of the Netherlands, with a letter writing campaign being set up to enable well wishers to send cards and letters to him while he was imprisoned. Amnesty International also organized a clemency campaign on van Damme's behalf, with members of the public encouraged to fax appeals for his death sentence to be commuted to both the President of Singapore and the Prime Minister of Singapore.

In contrast, many Singaporeans were unsympathetic and believed he should justly be hanged for trafficking such a large amount of illegal narcotics. Some also pointed out that van Damme should have been fully aware of the consequences of his actions due to the "DEATH FOR DRUG TRAFFICKERS" warning printed on the embarkation card every foreign visitor must fill out on arrival to the city state. Other citizens highlighted what they perceived to be double standards; the Dutch government had never intervened when a person of Asian or African descent was executed in Singapore, despite claiming to be against the death penalty as a matter of principle. The Prime Minister of Singapore, Goh Chok Tong, would later claim that 80% of Singaporean citizens approved of van Damme being sentenced to death.

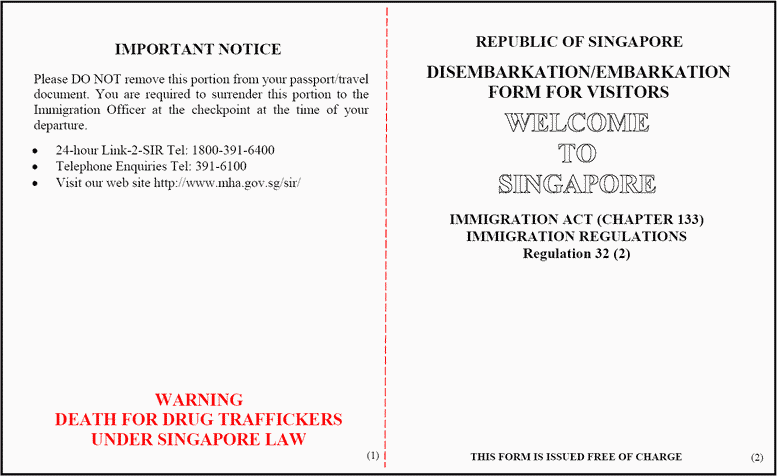
The Singapore embarkation card contains a warning to visitors about the death penalty for drug trafficking

== Incarceration on death row ==
Singapore-based Dutch national Guus van Bladel worked as a volunteer drugs counselor for the Singapore Anti-Narcotics Association in Changi Prison during the 1990s, and he visited van Damme weekly after he was convicted to help prepare him mentally for his execution. Van Bladel later published a book containing diary entries he kept during his time with van Damme, which purportedly detailed conversations they had in the visiting room of Changi Prison and also various events that occurred in relation to van Damme's criminal case.

Van Bladel alleged that van Damme (who's inmate ID number was C502/93) became more delusional as the day of execution approached and increasingly believed in his own innocence. He reportedly asked van Bladel constantly about efforts his Dutch relatives were making to find engineers to verify the "trunk lid formula" he himself had come up with. Van Bladel wrote that van Damme had asserted to him that if he could demonstrate that the average person would not notice the extra weight of a few kilograms of powder when they opened the type of suitcase he was arrested with, Van Damme felt he could prove that he had no reason to be suspicious and would therefore be able to rebut some of the trial judge's reasons for finding him guilty, and thus be able to quash his conviction.

In the days leading up to his execution, van Damme was reportedly given false hope (much to van Bladel's annoyance) when a dossier of information came to light about his work as an informant for the Holland-based Central Criminal Investigation Information Service (CRI) regarding an international oil trading scam in Nigeria. Van Damme seemed to have hoped that the report could be used to argue that he was set up by the same vengeful criminals he had provided information on, and that he could submit a new request for clemency, or get a re-trial where this new exculpatory evidence could be used to cast reasonable doubt on his guilt.

However, the Dutch Minister of Foreign Affairs, Hans van Mierlo, soon confirmed that although van Damme had had "incidental contact" with the CRI, there was no indication of a connection between van Damme's informant work and his arrest in Singapore. He also added that the report had already been handed over to van Damme's defense lawyer a year previously before the start of his trial, but van Damme did not want to use it during the proceedings, allegedly out of fear for the safety of his Nigeria-based family. Another possible reason for not submitting the report as evidence was that it also referenced van Damme's conviction in Holland for possessing 10 kilograms of cannabis, the revelation of which could have been prejudicial to him getting a fair trial.

Van Bladel would later theorize that van Damme's business in Nigeria was in some way bankrupted by local criminals, who then approached him through an intermediary to offer employment as a drug courier to help solve his financial difficulties. The CRI report partially corroborated van Bladel's theory by revealing van Damme was in financial distress, having been defrauded during an attempt in 1990 to import goods using borrowed funds, and then subsequently being robbed in public of a US$14,000 cash emergency loan provided by one of his adult daughters in Holland.

In the lead-up to his execution, van Damme was allowed to watch video tapes on a television set placed outside the barred door of his cell, and watched recordings of the 1994 FIFA World Cup as well as a movie depicting the Resurrection of Jesus. Van Damme was also allowed to order meals of his choice, and on the day before he was brought to the gallows, he had roast chicken with salad and Coca-Cola on ice for his evening meal, followed by fried eggs and sausages the next morning. A few hours before van Damme was put to death, his wife arrived from Nigeria for a final visit, and she was able to speak to him for several hours, along with Guus van Bladel and Dutch pastor Joop Spoor. Van Damme's final meal, at his request, was a specially made pea soup with sausage provided by the Dutch Embassy of Singapore.

== Execution ==
Van Damme was hanged before dawn at Changi Prison on the early morning of 23 September 1994. The Central Narcotics Bureau issued a press release at 11:30am stating: "A convicted drug smuggler, Johannes Van Damme, a man aged 59 and a Dutch national, was put to death in Changi Prison this morning." Van Damme's family subsequently published the telegram sent to them by Singaporean authorities: "Death sentence passed on Johannes Van Damme will be carried into effect on 23.9.94. Visit him on 20.9.94. Claim body on 23.9.94. Signed Superintendent, Changi Prison, Singapore."

Following the execution, Singapore's Foreign Minister, S. Jayakumar, responded to European calls for clemency by saying it had been completely untenable to make an exception for van Damme, as doing so would undermine the city state's reputation for integrity and impartial enforcement of its laws.

In an October 1995 interview with The Straits Times to promote his book about his time with van Damme, Guus van Bladel claimed that van Damme had confessed to him in private before the start of his trial that he had in fact willingly attempted to smuggle heroin from Bangkok to Athens on behalf of a Nigerian criminal organization.

== See also ==
- Capital punishment for drug trafficking
- Capital punishment in Singapore
- Disneyland with the Death Penalty
