= John Martin Scripps =

British serial killer

- Born: 9 December 1959; Letchworth, Hertfordshire, UK
- Died: 19 April 1996 (aged 36); Changi Prison, Singapore
- Other names: Simon James Davis; The Garden City Butcher
- Spouse: María Arellanos
- Status: Executed by hanging
- Conviction: Murder
- Penalty: Death

Details
- Victims: 3–6 (3 confirmed; 3 unconfirmed)

John Martin Scripps (9 December 1959 – 19 April 1996), also known as the Garden City Butcher, was an English serial killer who murdered three tourists—Gerard Lowe in Singapore, and Sheila and Darin Damude in Thailand—with another three potential (yet unconfirmed) victims. He posed as a tourist himself when committing the murders. He cut up all his victims' bodies, using butchery skills he had acquired in prison, before disposing of them.

Martin was arrested in Singapore—where he had killed Lowe—when he returned there after murdering the Damudes. Photographs of decomposed body parts were shown as evidence during his trial, making it "one of the most grisly" ever heard in Singapore. He defended himself by saying that Lowe's death was an accident and that a friend of his killed the Damudes. The judge did not believe Martin's account of events and condemned him to death by hanging, making him the first Briton since Singapore's independence from Britain and Malaysia to be given the death penalty. He is also one of the first Westerners to be executed in Singapore since independence, the first one being Johannes van Damme of the Netherlands in 1994.

== Early life ==
John Martin Scripps was born in Letchworth, Hertfordshire, on 9 December 1959, the son of Leonard and Jean Scripps, an East End lorry driver and a Fleet Street barmaid respectively. He travelled often in childhood, occasionally accompanied by his father, with whom he was very close. Leonard Scripps died by suicide when his son was nine. After his father's death, Scripps developed problems with reading and writing, which led to him leaving school at the age of 15. After dropping out of school he continued to travel, raising money for his trips by doing odd jobs and selling antiques.

== Criminal career ==
Scripps was convicted of his first crime in May 1974, when he was sentenced to a 12-month conditional discharge and fined £10 by Highgate Juvenile Court for burglary. The punishment did nothing to deter him from stealing, and by August 1976 he had stolen again three times. In June 1978, he was fined £40 for indecent assault.

While travelling in Mexico, Scripps met María Pilar Arellanos, of Cancún, and married her in 1980. They travelled together for two years until 1982, when he was sentenced to a three-year jail term for theft, burglary and resisting arrest. His imprisonment upset María, and their relationship was further soured when he ran away from jail during home leave in June 1985—just months short of completing his term—and burgled again. He was sentenced to another three years' imprisonment, during which she filed for divorce and married Police Constable Ken Cold, an officer in the Royal Protection Squad. This angered Scripps, who acted in revenge, stealing some of Cold's clothing while released on home leave. He was appeased only when she divorced her new husband and returned to her hometown. After he was released, Scripps legally changed his name to John Martin.

Scripps began trafficking in drugs, and carried heroin between Asia and Europe for a syndicate. Singapore authorities first encountered his name in 1987, when he was arrested at Heathrow Airport for possessing drugs. Police found a key on him that belonged to a safe deposit box in a bank in Orchard Road in Singapore, from which officers from Singapore's Central Narcotics Bureau seized 1.5 kilograms (3.3 lb) of heroin worth about US$1 million. For this and another drug offence, Southwark Crown Court in January 1988 sentenced him to seven years in jail. He escaped while on home leave but was later re-arrested. In July 1992, Winchester Crown Court added another six years to the original sentence, which would have kept him behind bars until 2001 had he not escaped again.

He was in custody at HMP Albany on the Isle of Wight from February 1992 to August 1993, where he became a model prisoner. Initially he did menial jobs such as dishwashing and general cleaning and was later promoted to the position of butcher, under the training of James Quigley, a prison caterer with more than 20 years' experience, and another inmate only identified as "Ginger", who had been a professional butcher. They taught him how to dismember and remove the bone from animals after slaughtering them. Martin performed his duties with such efficiency that he once told Quigley he wished to open a butcher's shop after his release.

On 20 August 1993, Martin was transferred from HMP Albany to HMP The Mount in Hemel Hempstead, Hertfordshire, as a result of a change in his security categorisation. In October 1994 he escaped while on home leave, which was granted only two days after being refused parole. His mother, noting that he had sold all his belongings to fellow inmates while in prison (a clear notice of his intention to escape), asked prison authorities not to release him. After Martin was sentenced to death, she reiterated:

The Home Office have buried their head in the sand over this. They know full well that if they had done what I told them, none of this would have ever happened. I begged them not to let him go.

His mother gave Scripps £200 to travel overseas after his arrest. To avoid recapture, he used the birth certificate of another inmate, Simon James Davis, to get a passport in Davis's name. Within a month of his escape, he turned up in Mexico as John Martin. He reported to the British Embassy there that he had lost his passport, and managed to get a replacement. Martin arrived in Singapore from San Francisco at about 2 a.m. SST on 8 March 1995 (6 p.m. UTC on 7 March).

== Murder of tourists ==
Martin killed at least three people in Singapore and Thailand, and was investigated for other murders in Belize, Mexico, and the United States. His modus operandi was to pose as a tourist and converse with another randomly chosen Caucasian, either aboard their flights or while waiting at airports. He stayed in the same hotels as his victims in a room near theirs. Once he had an excuse to be in their rooms, he used an electroshock weapon to immobilise them before killing them by striking their heads with a hammer and cutting them up in their bathrooms. He chose Caucasians as his victims because they were vacationing far away from their home countries, which made him less likely to be discovered. His motive apparently included money, as large amounts were withdrawn using the credit cards of Gerard Lowe and Timothy MacDowall.

=== Gerard Lowe ===
Gerard Lowe
- Born: Gerard George Lowe; 3 June 1962; South Africa
- Died: 8 March 1995 (aged 32); Singapore
- Cause of death: Homicide
- Occupation: Chemical engineer
- Employer: South African Breweries
- Known for: Murder victim
- Height: 1.7 m (5 ft 7 in)
- Spouse: Vanessa Lowe
- Children: 1

Gerard George Lowe came from Johannesburg, South Africa. He was a chemical engineer with South African Breweries. He went to Singapore to shop for electrical and electronic goods. Before he left Johannesburg on 7 March 1995, he told his wife Vanessa, a local airline employee, his exact schedule, saying: "I will call you the moment I check into the hotel to give you the contact number. If you do not hear from me on 10 March, it would mean that I would have a seat on the plane to return to South Africa and would arrive home on 11 March. But if I do call you on 10 March, that would mean that I have not managed to get a seat and would return on 12 March."

When Lowe arrived at Singapore Changi Airport on the morning of 8 March, he was approached by Martin (under the assumed name of Simon Davis), who struck up a conversation with him and suggested that they share a room, to which Lowe agreed. They managed to book Room 1511 in the River View Hotel off Havelock Road. The next morning, Martin asked a hotel receptionist to delete Lowe's name from the room registration system, saying that he had kicked Lowe out the previous night for being a homosexual, which was illegal in Singapore at the time.

Later that day, Martin forged Lowe's signature and used his credit card to withdraw $6,000 from a branch of DBS Bank at Raffles City Shopping Centre. He would withdraw a further $2,400 in cash using the same technique over the next few days. Martin also bought a $490 video recorder (which he mailed to his sister in England) and a $180 pair of Nike Alpha Trainer shoes with Lowe's credit card, and even attended a performance by the Singapore Symphony Orchestra. On 11 March, he visited a Thomas Cook travel agency office in Anson Road to arrange the transfer of $8,500 in cash and US$5,000 in converted traveller's cheques to a San Francisco based bank account in the name of 'John Martin'. After being informed the transfer would take a few days to complete, he also bought a $485 return air ticket to Phuket via Bangkok with cash, and departed from Singapore at 7pm that same evening.

On 13 March 1995, a pair of legs, severed at the knees, was found in a plastic bag floating off Clifford Pier. Three days later, a pair of thighs and a torso were found in the same area, also in a plastic bag. Initially, Singapore police could only determine that the body parts belonged to a Caucasian, and they had a possible name after receiving a missing person report for Lowe from the South African High Commission. Vanessa Lowe filed the report because she was distressed that her husband, who used to make daily contact with his family when overseas, had not called home or returned to South Africa by 12 March. Lowe's colleagues at work also tried to determine his whereabouts through personal contacts in Singapore. Singaporean authorities decided not to immediately inform the local media about the discovery, as they did not want to alert the suspected killer to the fact Lowe's remains had been found and possibly dissuading him from returning to the country if he had already fled. On 1 April, Vanessa Lowe confirmed that the body parts were her husband's through visual identification. However, his arms and head were never found. According to Professor Chao Tzee Cheng, the senior forensic pathologist, he was unable to determine the cause of death due to the absence of the head or any severe injuries on the other body parts available for his post-mortem examination, but he noted that the body parts were being expertly dismembered, suggesting that the killer of Lowe was either a trained doctor, medical surgeon, veterinarian surgeon or a butcher; Martin made use of the butchery skills he picked up at prison to dismember the body of Lowe after killing him.

=== Sheila and Darin Damude ===
Sheila Mae Damude (22 May 1945 – 16 March 1995) and her son Darin Jon Damude (13 November 1972 – 16 March 1995) came from Saanich, British Columbia, Canada. She was an administrator at the Pacific Christian School in Victoria, while Darin was a college student. They had come to Thailand on holiday, with Darin flying to Asia first before Sheila met him in Bangkok during spring break. They flew to Phuket on 15 March with Martin (still using his assumed name) who was sitting in the same row as them. He befriended the two and they checked into Nilly's Marina Inn facing Patong Beach. Martin was given Room 48 and the Damudes were given the adjacent Room 43. The Damudes were not seen again after they ate breakfast the next morning; at about 11 a.m. THA (5 a.m. UTC), Martin asked the inn's receptionist to switch his room to Room 43, saying that the Damudes had left and that he would pay their bill.

Martin checked out and returned to Singapore on 19 March. On that day the skulls of the Damudes were found in a disused tin mine in Kathu district. A torso and a pair each of arms and legs were found along Bahn Nai Trang Road, 9.7 kilometres (6 mi) away, five days later. The body parts were so badly decomposed that visual identification was impossible; Royal Thai Police used dental records to identify the skulls and forensic analysis concluded that the torso, arms, and legs were likely to be Sheila's. The other parts of Darin's body were never found.

=== Unconfirmed victims ===
Scotland Yard suspected Martin of having separately killed two men from south London: financial adviser Timothy MacDowall and accountant William Shackel. In Mexico, Martin had discussed with his wife about going scuba diving with MacDowall, who was taking scuba lessons while on holiday on an island off Belize. MacDowall disappeared in Belize in early 1995 but police could not conclusively match him to body parts later found in that country; the only suspicious activity they uncovered was the transfer of £21,000 from MacDowall's bank account to an account in San Francisco under Martin's name. MacDowall is believed to have been murdered as he slept and his remains thrown into a crocodile-infested river. Martin refused to be interviewed by Scotland Yard while he was on death row in Changi Prison, thus whether he killed MacDowall remains unconfirmed. Shackel was reported missing while on holiday in Cancún, Mexico. Police reports said that Martin was in Cancún the day Shackel cashed traveller's cheques worth £4,000, after which he disappeared.

Martin was also wanted in San Francisco in the United States for the murder of sex worker Tom Wenger on 28 March 1994. Wenger's body was chopped up and drained of blood; it was found in a garbage skip (dumpster) in Myrtle Alley in the Polk Street district. Martin's photograph matched a facial composite picture of a suspect made by San Francisco police, but he was formally eliminated as a suspect after it was established that he was living in a British halfway house at the time of the murder. He was also investigated for another murder in Arizona.

== Arrest and remand ==
Oblivious to the fact Lowe's remains had already been found by the police, and wanting to complete the transfer of money from Thomas Cook to his bank account in the United States, Martin returned to Singapore on the evening of 19 March 1995. He was promptly arrested when he arrived at Changi Airport and produced a passport with his assumed name, Simon Davis. Police had put the name on their wanted list on 14 March after they determined that Lowe had checked into River View Hotel with someone by that name. In a police interview room in the airport, Martin smashed a glass panel and was about to cut his wrist with a shard of glass in a suicide attempt, fearing that he would be hanged like Flor Contemplacion, a Filipina who had been hanged two days before for a double murder. He had a small cut on his vein so he was taken to Alexandra Hospital for treatment.

The police found five passports on Martin in addition to his own—two British passports issued to Simon Davis, two Canadian passports issued to Sheila and Darin Damude, and a South African passport issued to Gerard Lowe—each with Martin's photograph affixed. They also found credit cards belonging to Sheila Damude and Gerard Lowe. In addition, police found Simon Davis' birth certificate, and items that Martin had used to immobilise and kill: a hammer weighing 1.5 kilogrammes (3.3 lb), a battery-operated Z-Force III electroshock weapon, a can of mace, two pairs of handcuffs, a pair of thumbcuffs, two Police brand foldable knives, an oilstone and two Swiss army knives. Importation of some of these into Singapore is illegal.

On 21 March 1995, Martin was taken to court on an initial charge, naming him as Simon James Davis and accusing him of forging Lowe's signature on a DBS Bank credit card transaction slip to obtain S$6,000 in cash on 9 March. Three days later, he was charged under his real name for the murder of Gerard Lowe in a River View Hotel room some time between 8 and 9 March. In subsequent hearings, he was additionally charged with forgery (forging Lowe's signature five more times to obtain cash and goods worth $3,200), vandalism (smashing the glass panel), possession of an offensive weapon (the electroshock weapon), and possession of a controlled drug (he had 24 sticks of cannabis at the time of his arrest).

On 18 September, a preliminary enquiry in a district court was held to determine whether there was sufficient evidence for a trial to proceed. The magistrate overseeing the enquiry ordered Martin to stand trial for Gerard Lowe's murder on 2 October after hearing statements from 39 witnesses, and looking at more than 100 exhibits and 100 photographs that the prosecution had prepared as evidence.

On 20 September 1995, a Singapore Prisons Department spokesman announced that two British journalists had deceived prison officials into letting them visit Martin, and then interview him, twice while he was on remand in Tanah Merah prison between June and July, adding the matter had been referred to the police. The journalists (Andrew Drummond and Gary Jones) later admitted visiting him separately, along with his sister Janet Martin, with the subsequent report being published in the News of the World on 2 July 1995. On 6 October, whilst in Singapore to attend Martin's trial, Janet Martin was interviewed by police regarding the journalists committing the criminal offence of giving false information to a public servant to make him use his lawful power (by allegedly telling prison officials they were Martin's cousins). No charges were filed.

== Trial ==
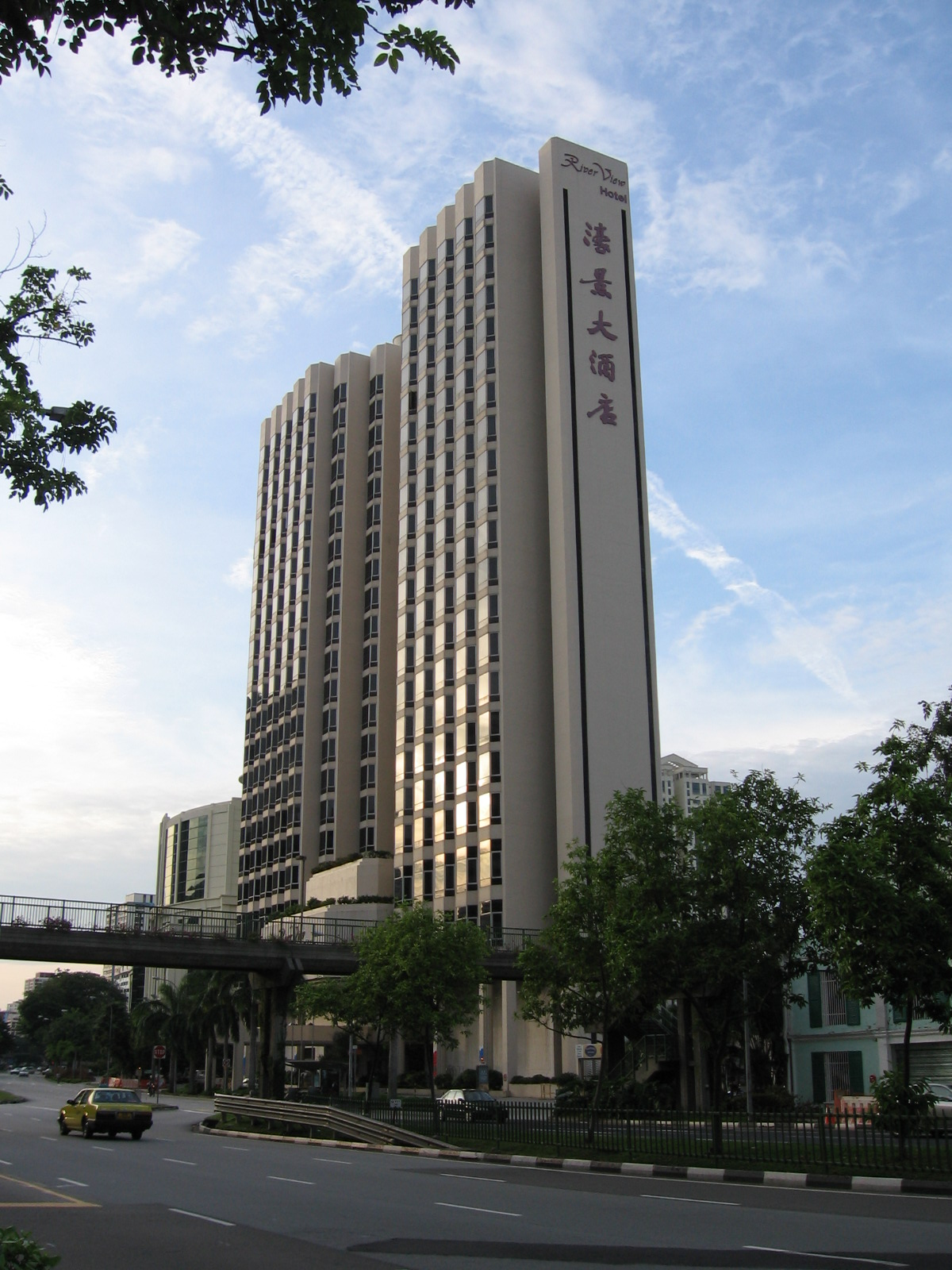
River View Hotel (now Four Points by Sheraton Singapore).

The trial of John Martin Scripps for the murder of Gerard Lowe began on 2 October 1995 in the High Court of Singapore. Before the trial, Martin made a statement explaining that he killed Lowe in self-defence. He said he had fallen asleep after checking in, but woke up after someone touched his buttocks; it was Lowe, who was clad only in his underwear and smiling at him. To him, this behaviour made Lowe appear to be a homosexual, so he kicked Lowe away. This angered Lowe, who threw Martin's hammer at his stomach. Martin then grabbed the hammer and "hit [Lowe] several times on the head until he collapsed onto the carpeted floor." Martin then fled in a taxi to the Sentosa hotel of a 'British friend' and confessed to accidentally killing Lowe. Martin spent the night in Sentosa, while his friend travelled to the River View Hotel and disposed of Lowe's body by throwing it into the Singapore River. Martin continued, "I am not sure what was the next thing I did ... everything was such a blur to me after this incident that I was walking around in a dream world for the next few days." He refused to identify his friend, saying, "I cannot tell you his identity because if he knew he would harm my family back in Britain." Martin claimed his friend was a drug trafficker aged in his 40s, and that he had previously worked for him as an international drug courier in the late 1980s. On 15 March, he flew to Phuket, where he met his friend again. His friend gave him the passports and other items belonging to the Damudes, whom he never met.

In court, Martin argued that he was by nature not a violent person. "I may have worked in the (prison) butchery, but cutting up a human body is another thing. When I saw the photographs (of Lowe's body parts), it made me feel sick." He maintained that he had killed Lowe after the latter made homosexual advances that caused him to "freak out"; he had previously fended off homosexual attacks twice while imprisoned: in Israel in 1978, and in England in 1994. When Deputy Public Prosecutors Jennifer Marie and Norul Rashid asked him what he did after killing Lowe, he said that he could not remember anything because he had drunk heavily and consumed Valium after Lowe's death until he was arrested. He repeated that he had not killed the Damudes, and that he had come back to Singapore from Phuket to clear his conscience about Lowe's death. The prosecution cast doubt on Martin's claims of an inability to remember events clearly due to the effect of alcohol and drugs, pointing out how he could write such neat and similar hand writing replicas on the memo pad he used in Phuket to practice forging the Damudes' signatures.

Memo pad with Martin's attempts to replicate Darin Damude's signature

DPP Jennifer Marie challenged Martin that his mysterious friend did not exist, and produced evidence of Martin having signed a River View Hotel restaurant bill on the night of 8 March (when Martin had said he was at the hotel of his 'friend' in Sentosa) to support this rebuttal. Martin claimed he attempted to call his friend at two different Sentosa hotels, the Beaufort and the Shangri La Rasa Sentosa Resort, but was informed his friend was no longer at either of them, and Martin's itemised bill from the River View Hotel confirmed he did in fact ring both hotels on the 10 March. Martin testified his friend rang him later that night to let him know he had moved to another hotel in Marina Centre, however he could not remember if it was the Marina Mandarin, the Oriental or the Pan Pacific hotel.

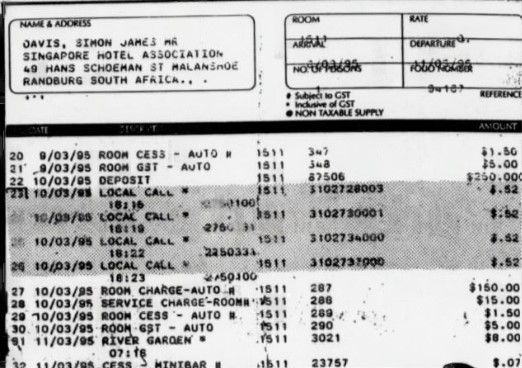
Martin's bill from the River View Hotel, with 4 phone calls to Sentosa hotels highlighted

After this disclosure during Martin's cross examination, Assistant Superintendent Gerald Lim and his team approached all five hotels to obtain the names of all single male guests who checked in or out on 10 March 1995. This produced a list of 150 men who checked out of the Beaufort and the Shangri La Rasa Sentosa Resort on the day in question, that was then cross checked against the names of those who checked into the three Marina Centre hotels. ASP Lim testified that none of the names appeared on the check in register of any of the hotels, however he agreed with a defence lawyers observation that the results would not be conclusive if Martin's 'friend' had checked in under different names in each hotel.

Also, statements from two hotel chamber maids describing a "strange smell" in room 1511 when they made up the room between March 9 and March 11, along with a statement from a hotel security guard saying he witnessed Martin leaving the hotel with a large suitcase early on the morning of 11 March and then returning without it 15 minutes later, were used by the Prosecution to imply that Lowe's body was stored in the room for a number of days and then was disposed of by Martin himself.

The Prosecution alleged Martin had killed Lowe in order to rob him, not to ward off an unwanted sexual attack. Receipts from a shopping spree by Martin using Lowe's credit card was also cited as evidence of premeditation and a rebuttal of him "walking around in a dream world" after the murder. Martin had earlier testified that he had previously taken photocopies of other people's passports with his own photo attached so he could attempt to cash their traveller's cheques, which further underscored a financial motive for the murders. DPP Jennifer Marie also highlighted similar fact evidence between the deaths of Shelia and Darin Damude in Thailand and the killing of Gerard Lowe in Singapore, as they rebutted Martin's defence of killing Lowe unintentionally by demonstrating how Martin stood to gain financially from their deaths. The similarities presented to the court included:

Murder of Gerard Lowe	Murders of Shelia and Darin Damude
Martin met Lowe at Changi Airport and shared a taxi to the River View Hotel	Martin met the Damudes at Phuket Airport and shared a limousine to Nilly's Marina Inn
Martin checked into the same hotel room as Lowe in Singapore	Martin checked into the room next door to the Damudes in Thailand
Martin testified to killing Lowe by hitting him on the head with a hammer	The Damudes' skulls had serious fractures, which could have been caused by a hammer
Lowe's body was expertly cut at the joints before disposal	The Damudes' bodies were expertly cut at the joints before disposal
Martin kept Lowe's credit cards, travelers cheques and personal belongings	Martin kept the Damudes' credit cards, travelers cheques and personal belongings
Martin forged Lowe's signature on a number of documents, such as credit card transaction slips	Martin practiced forging the Damudes' signatures
Martin glued his own photograph into Lowe's passport	Martin glued his own photograph into both the Damudes' passports

On 7 November, Judge T. S. Sinnathuray adjourned the trial for three days to consider his verdict. (Singapore abolished jury trials in 1969.) When the trial resumed, the judge was satisfied that the prosecution had made its case and dismissed Martin's version of events. He found Martin guilty and condemned him to death. In his verdict, Justice Sinnathuray said:

I'm satisfied beyond a reasonable doubt that Martin had intentionally killed Lowe. After that, he disarticulated Lowe's body into separate parts, and it was he who subsequently disposed of the body parts by throwing them into the river behind the hotel.

On the evidence, I had no difficulty to find that it was Martin who was concerned with the deaths of Sheila and Darin and for the disposal of their body parts found in different sites in Phuket. The disarticulation of the body parts of Lowe, Sheila and Darin have the hallmark signs of having been done by the same person. Altogether, this similar fact evidence reinforces the decision I have made, for it puts beyond doubt that Martin is guilty on the charge of murder.

The sentence of this court upon you is that you will be taken from this place to a lawful prison and taken to a place to be hanged by the neck until you are dead. And may the Lord have mercy on your soul.

== Execution ==
=== Withdrawal of appeal ===
On 15 November 1995, Martin announced he would appeal against the sentence. He dropped the appeal without giving an explanation on 4 January 1996, four days before it was to have been heard. He turned down a subsequent chance to petition then President of Singapore Ong Teng Cheong for clemency, saying that he was impatient to be executed.

=== Martin's final days and words ===
In the days before his hanging, Martin wrote of an "emptiness" inside him and lamented that no one had loved him besides his family and his ex-wife María, in a series of misspelled notes (he was semi-literate):

One day poor. One day reach. Money filds the pane of hunger but what will fill the emteness inside? I know that love is beyond me. So do I give myself to god. The god that has betrad me. Can I be a person again? Only time will tell me.

You may take my life for what it is worth, but grant thows that I love, pease and happiness.

He complained that in prison, "You are told every day that you are not a member of the uman rase [a misspelling of 'human race']." The week before he was due to hang, he dreamed that he had avoided the sentence by committing suicide:

I tied the rope around my little neck before I got up on the old creaky chair. I reached down and picked up a handful of earth and put it in my mouth. Then I crawled up to the old creaky chair and pulled the rope tighter and tighter still. I was on tiptoe, just one more pull, then my feet left the chair knocking it over and darkness embraced me as the heavens opened. I woke up in darkness and felt a heavy weight on my chest. I cried out, "Mummy, I am here."

Martin's mother remarked, "Whoever he is now, he's the person the prison service trained him to be. These bastards have no right to take my son's life. I brought him into the world. I am the only person who can take him out of it." However, no one formally protested against the hanging. The British government also decided to not submit a plea for clemency to the Singapore government.

Four days before his execution, in an interview with criminologist Christopher Berry-Dee, Martin described in detail how he murdered Gerard Lowe and then dismembered his body.

=== Last meal and hanging ===
On 19 April 1996, after a last meal of pizza and hot chocolate, 36-year-old John Martin Scripps was hanged in Changi Prison alongside Singaporean heroin traffickers Richard Low Gee Boon and Lee Meng Hong. On that day, the Royal Canadian Mounted Police and the Royal Thai Police closed their files on the murders of Sheila and Darin Damude, declaring the case effectively solved.

At the time of his execution, Martin became the first Briton to be executed in Singapore since the nation's independence from British colonial rule in 1959. He was also one of the first Europeans to receive the death penalty in Singapore.

== Post-death coverage ==
In May 1996, Tan Ooi Boon, a reporter from The Straits Times who covered Martin's case from start to finish, wrote a book on the case, titled Body Parts: A British Serial Killer in Singapore. He wrote the book in three months using material he had prepared for the newspaper. It mixed fictional narrative with fact and described how Martin disposed of his victims' bodies.

In July 1996, the story of how Martin murdered Gerard Lowe, and the investigation that followed, was featured in an episode of the Singapore Crimewatch, which was shown on Television Corporation of Singapore's Channel 5 and Channel 8. In the episode, the real evidence of the case and actual photographs from the autopsy were shown, causing the series to be the first current affairs programme in Singapore to be given the PG (Parental Guidance) warning tag. Police justified their use of the photographs, saying that they wanted to "give an accurate account of the case to the public.". The story was also re-enacted in the last episode of the first season of MediaCorp TV's Channel 5 docu-drama True Files on 1 August 2002. The episode is currently viewable via meWATCH since 5 February 2016.

On 31 January 1997, eight police officers who made significant contributions towards Martin's conviction were awarded commemorative plaques by the High Commissioner for Canada in Singapore, Barry Carin.

== See also ==
- Johannes van Damme
- Took Leng How
- List of serial killers by country
- Flor Contemplacion
- Kho Jabing
- Leong Siew Chor
- Death sentence in Singapore
- John Haigh, another executed British serial killer and con artist
