= List of ambassadors of the Philippines to Singapore =

Ambassador of the Republic of the Philippines to the Republic of Singapore
- Sugo ng Republika ng Pilipinas sa Singapore; Duta Republik Filipina ke Republik Singapura 菲律賓共和國駐新加坡共和國大使 (Chinese); Fēilǜbīn gònghéguó zhù xīnjiāpō gònghéguó dàshǐ (pinyin) சிங்கப்பூர் குடியரசின் பிலிப்பைன்ஸ் குடியரசின் தூதர் (Tamil); Ciṅkappūr kuṭiyaraciṉ pilippaiṉs kuṭiyaraciṉ tūtar
- Seal of the Department of Foreign Affairs of the Philippines
- Incumbent; Medardo G. Macaraig since February 15, 2023
- Department of Foreign Affairs; Embassy of the Philippines, Singapore
- Style: His Excellency
- Reports to: Department of Foreign Affairs
- Seat: Tanglin, Singapore
- Nominator: Secretary of Foreign Affairs
- Appointer: President of the Philippines; with the advice and consent of the Commission on Appointments
- Term length: No fixed term
- Inaugural holder: Tomas C. Benitez
- Formation: 1966
- Website: Official website of the Embassy of the Philippines, Singapore

The ambassador of the Republic of the Philippines to Singapore (Filipino: Sugo ng Republika ng Pilipinas sa Singapore; Malay: Duta Filipina ke Singapura; Chinese: 菲律賓共和國駐新加坡共和國大使; pinyin: Fēilǜbīn gònghéguó zhù xīnjiāpō gònghéguó dàshǐ; Tamil: சிங்கப்பூர் குடியரசின் பிலிப்பைன்ஸ் குடியரசின் தூதர், romanized: Ciṅkappūr kuṭiyaraciṉ pilippaiṉs kuṭiyaraciṉ tūtar) is the Republic of the Philippines' foremost diplomatic representative in the Republic of Singapore. As head of the Philippines' diplomatic mission there, the ambassador is the official representative of the president and the government of the Philippines to the president and government of Singapore. The position has the rank and status of an ambassador extraordinary and plenipotentiary.

== List of representatives ==
Head of mission	Tenure	Singaporean president	Singaporean prime minister	Philippine president	Note(s)
Tomas C. Benitez	1966−1967	Yusof Ishak	Lee Kuan Yew; Goh Chok Tong	Ferdinand Marcos	Previously, a Chief of Protocol at the Philippine Embassy in Washington, D.C.
Delfin R. Garcia	1971−1978	Benjamin Sheares; Devan Nair	Lee Kuan Yew; Goh Chok Tong	Ferdinand Marcos	
Privado G. Jimenez	1978−1985	Benjamin Sheares; Devan Nair	Lee Kuan Yew; Goh Chok Tong	Ferdinand Marcos	
Francisco L. Benedicto	1986−1993	Devan Nair; Wee Kim Wee; Ong Teng Cheong	Lee Kuan Yew; Goh Chok Tong	Ferdinand Marcos; Corazon Aquino; Fidel V. Ramos	
Alicia C. Ramos	1993−1995	Ong Teng Cheong	Goh Chok Tong	Fidel V. Ramos	Recalled after the execution of Flor Contemplacion.
Alberto A. Encomienda	1996−1998	Ong Teng Cheong	Goh Chok Tong	Fidel V. Ramos	
Jesus I. Yabes	1999−2002	Ong Teng Cheong; S. R. Nathan	Goh Chok Tong	Joseph Estrada; Gloria Macapagal Arroyo	
Ernesto V. Llamas	2002−2003	S. R. Nathan	Goh Chok Tong	Gloria Macapagal Arroyo	
Belen F. Anota	2004−2008	S. R. Nathan	Goh Chok Tong; Lee Hsien Loong	Gloria Macapagal Arroyo	
Minda Calaguian-Cruz	2008−2014	S. R. Nathan; Tony Tan	Lee Hsien Loong	Gloria Macapagal Arroyo; Benigno Aquino III	Credentials were presented to President Nathan on September 25, 2008.
Antonio A. Morales	2014−2017	Tony Tan; Halimah Yacob	Lee Hsien Loong	Benigno Aquino III; Rodrigo Duterte	Credentials were presented to President Tan on May 29, 2014.
Joseph del Mar Yap	2018−2022	Halimah Yacob	Lee Hsien Loong	Rodrigo Duterte; Bongbong Marcos	Previously, a special envoy of the President from November 2016 to June 2017. Credentials were presented to President Halimah on January 25, 2018.
Medardo G. Macaraig	2023−present	Halimah Yacob; Tharman Shanmugaratnam	Lee Hsien Loong; Lawrence Wong	Bongbong Marcos	Credentials were presented to President Halimah on February 15, 2023.
Source: Embassy of the Republic of the Philippines, Singapore

== See also ==
- Philippines–Singapore relations
