= Embassy of Singapore, Manila =

Diplomatic mission of the Republic of Singapore in the Republic of the Philippines

Embassy of Singapore, Manila Kedutaan Republik Singapura di Manila (Malay) 新加坡共和国驻马尼拉大使馆 (Mandarin Chinese) Xīnjiāpō Gònghéguó Zhù Mǎnílā Dàshǐguǎn மணிலா சிங்கப்பூர் குடியரசு தூதரகம் (Tamil) Maṇilā Ciṅkappūr Kuṭiyaracu Tūtarakam
- Location: Taguig, Metro Manila
- Address: 505 Rizal Drive, Fort Bonifacio, 1635 Taguig, Metro Manila
- Coordinates: 14°32′46.6872″N 121°02′47.9292″E
- Ambassador: Constance See
- Jurisdiction: Philippines
- Website: www.mfa.gov.sg/manila

The Embassy of the Republic of Singapore in Manila is the diplomatic mission of Singapore in the Philippines. The chancery is situated at 505 Rizal Drive in Fort Bonifacio, Taguig, Metro Manila, within the Bonifacio Global City business district.

== Background ==
Full diplomatic relations commenced between Singapore and the Philippines on May 16, 1969. Singaporean interests in the Philippines were handled by the Malaysian Embassy prior to the establishment of the chancery. The first resident ambassador accredited to the Philippines was Haji Ya'acob bin Mohamed, when he presented his credentials to then President Ferdinand Marcos on October 16, 1969. Finally, the embassy was established in 1973.

== The Embassy ==
The embassy is currently headed by Ambassador Constance See, and staffed by the Deputy Chief of Mission and Counsellor, another Counsellor, the Defence Attaché, the First Secretary, the First Secretary (Political) and the Second Secretary (Admin & Consular). The present chancery is designed by Forum Architects of Singapore together with local EBP Architects, to complete the multi-structure complex in 2008. Its former location was housed in The Enterprise Center Tower 1 in Makati Central Business District.

== See also ==
- Embassy of the Philippines, Singapore
- List of diplomatic missions of Singapore
- Philippines–Singapore relations
