= Toa Payoh ritual murders =

1981 series of murders and rapes in Singapore

Coordinates: 1°20′13″N 103°51′26″E

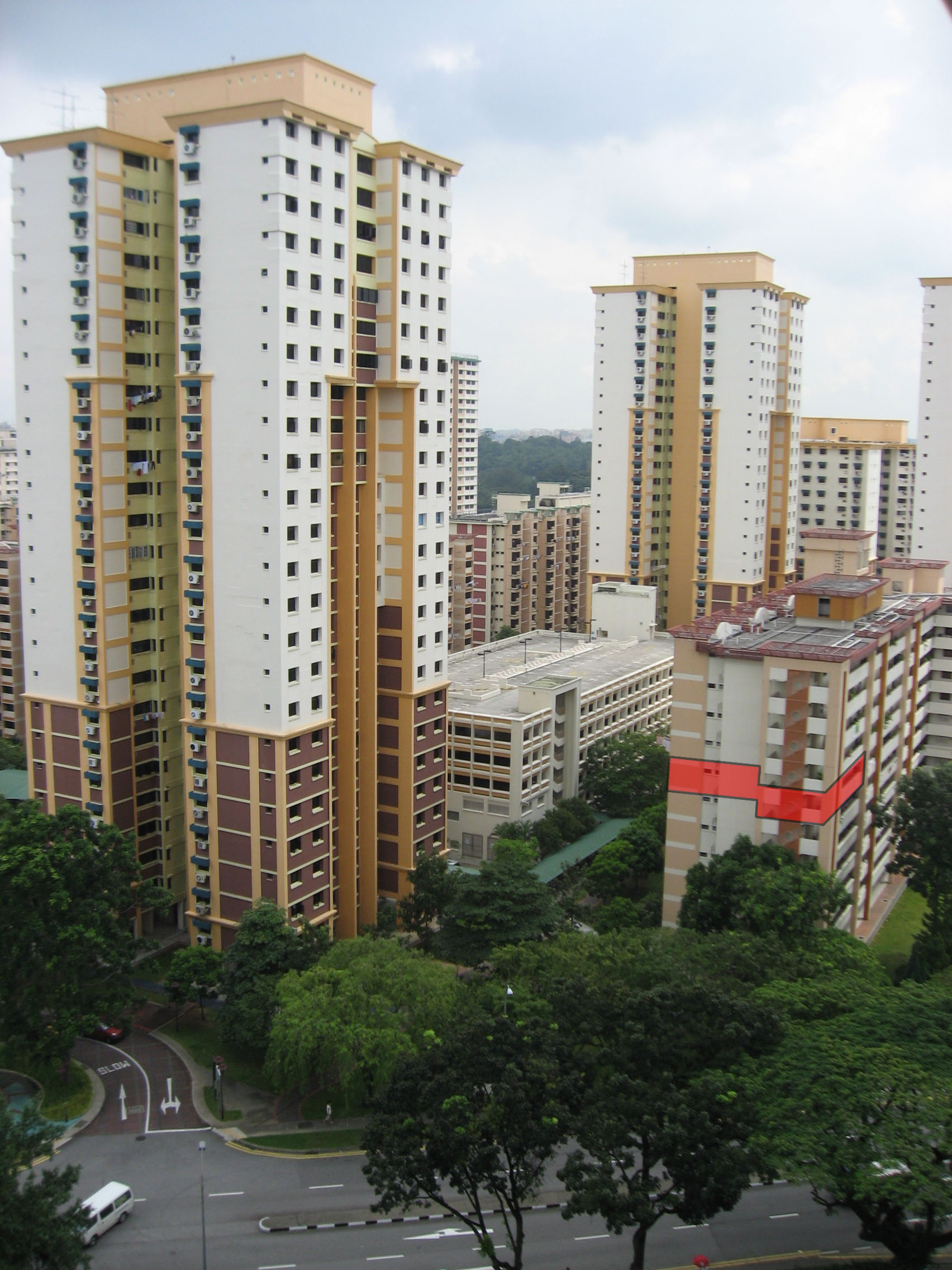
- Lim's flat (highlighted in red), where the murders took place
- Date: 24 January 1981
- Location: Toa Payoh, Central Region, Singapore
- Motive: Ritual murders
- Deaths: Agnes Ng Siew Heok, 9; Ghazali bin Marzuki, 10
- Convicted: Adrian Lim; Tan Mui Choo; Hoe Kah Hong

The Toa Payoh ritual murders took place in Singapore in 1981. On 25 January, the body of a nine-year-old girl was found at a block of public housing flats in the town of Toa Payoh, and two weeks later, the body of a ten-year-old boy was found nearby.

The murders were masterminded by Adrian Lim, a self-styled healer who pretended to have supernatural powers and scammed people for years before the murders. He had also been sexually assaulting female clients, often preying on younger women from impoverished backgrounds. He married one such woman, Catherine Tan Mui Choo, and took another woman, Hoe Kah Hong, as his "holy wife"—a term he used to manipulate women into having sex with him. Lim subjected them to extensive physical, mental and financial abuse, as well as sexual torture, for years before instigating the killings.

In 1980, Lim drugged and raped a woman who filed rape charges against him. To derail police investigations, Lim decided to kill children and also sexually assaulted the girl victim. The women were forced to assist him. The three of them were arrested after the police found a trail of blood leading from the body of the boy to their flat. Although the case name suggested ritual murders, the defendants said they did not conduct prayers, burning of joss sticks, ringing of bells, or any other rituals during the killings.

The 41-day trial was the second longest to have been held in the courts of Singapore at the time. None of the defendants denied their guilt. Their appointed counsels pleaded diminished responsibility, arguing that the accused were mentally ill and could not be held entirely responsible for the killings. Their experts, doctors and psychologists, analysed the defendants and concluded that they had exhibited schizophrenia, and depressions of the psychotic and manic order. The prosecution's expert, however, refuted testimonies and argued that all three individuals were in full control of their mental faculties when they planned and carried out the murders. The judges agreed with the prosecution's case and sentenced the trio to death. While on death row, the women appealed to the Privy Council in London and pleaded for clemency from the President of Singapore to no avail. Lim did not seek any pardons. The three were hanged on 25 November 1988.

Reports of the trio's deeds and the court proceedings were closely followed and remained prominent in the Singaporean consciousness for several years. Twice, movie companies tried to capitalise on the sensation generated by the murders by producing motion pictures based on the killings; critics panned both films for indulging in gratuitous sex and violence, and the movies performed poorly at the box office. The actions and behaviour of the three killers were studied by academics in the criminal psychology field, and the rulings set by the courts became local case studies for diminished responsibility.

== Murders ==
For several years Adrian Lim, a medium in Block 12, Toa Payoh Lorong 7, had been performing noisy rituals in the middle of the night. The residents complained several times to the authorities, but the rituals would always resume after a short time.

1. Church where Agnes Ng was last seen alive; 2. Location of Adrian Lim's flat; 3. Building where Agnes Ng's body was found

On the afternoon of 24 January 1981, nine-year-old Agnes Ng Siew Heok (Chinese: 黄秀叶; pinyin: Huáng Xìuyè), a student of Holy Innocents Chinese Girl School, disappeared. She was last seen at about 4 pm by her sister and friend at the Church of Risen Christ, where the sisters attended Bible classes. Ten hours later, Ng's body was found in a large brown vinyl travel bag at Block 11, almost exactly one kilometre (0.62 miles) from the church. She had been suffocated, and the investigation revealed injuries to her genitals and semen in her rectum.

On 7 February, the body of ten-year-old Ghazali bin Marzuki, a student from Henry Park Primary School, was found under a tree between Blocks 10 and 11. He had been missing since the previous day, after being seen boarding a taxi with an unknown woman. Forensic pathologists on the scene deemed the cause of death as drowning, and found on the boy suffocation marks similar to those on Ng. There were no signs of sexual assault. There were burns on the boy's back and a puncture on his arm. Traces of a sedative were later detected in his blood.

The police found a scattered trail of blood that led to the seventh floor of Block 12. Stepping into the common corridor from the stairwell, Inspector Pereira noticed an eclectic mix of religious symbols (a cross, a mirror, and a knife-blade) on the entrance of the first flat (unit number 467F). The owner of the flat, Adrian Lim, approached the inspector and introduced himself, informing Pereira that he was living there with his wife, Tan Mui Choo, and a girlfriend, Hoe Kah Hong. Permitted by Lim to search his flat, the police found traces of blood. Lim initially tried to pass the stains off as candle wax, but when challenged claimed they were chicken blood. After the police found slips of paper written with the dead children's personal details, Lim tried to allay suspicions by claiming that Ghazali had come to his flat seeking treatment for a bleeding nose. He removed hair from under a carpet and tried to flush it down the toilet, but the police stopped him; forensics later determined the hair to be Ng's. Requesting a background check on Lim, Pereira received word from local officers that the medium was currently involved in a rape investigation. Lim overheard them and became agitated, raising his voice at the law enforcers. Hoe also started getting agitated. Their actions further raised the investigators' suspicions that the trio were deeply involved in the murders. The police collected the evidence, sealed the flat as a crime scene, and took Lim and the two women in for questioning.

== Perpetrators ==
=== Adrian Lim ===
Born on 6 January 1942, Adrian Lim (Chinese: 林宝龙; pinyin: Lín Bǎolóng) was the eldest son of a middle-income family. Described at the trial by his sister as a hot-tempered boy, he was enrolled at Anglo-Chinese School (ACS) but dropped out. He worked in a variety of jobs, including as an informant for the Singapore government agency Internal Security Department.

In 1962, he joined the cable radio company Rediffusion Singapore where he worked for 14 years. For three years, he installed and serviced Rediffusion sets as an electrician before being promoted to bill collector. In April 1967, Lim married his childhood sweetheart with whom he had two children. He converted to Catholicism for his marriage. Lim and his family lived in rented rooms until his 1970 purchase of a three-room flat—a seventh floor unit (unit number 467F) of Block 12, Toa Payoh.

In 1973, Lim started part-time practice as a spirit medium. Lim usually preyed on vulnerable girls and women, often much younger than him, with little education and were from abusive or impoverished background. He rented a room where he attended to the women—most of whom were bargirls, dance hostesses, and prostitutes—introduced to him by his landlord. Lim's customers also included superstitious men and elderly women, whom he cheated only of cash. Lim continued these actions up until his arrest in 1981.

Lim had learned the trade from a bomoh called "Uncle Willie" and prayed to gods of various religions despite his Catholic baptism. The Hindu goddess Kali and "Phragann", (Note: Lim used a small figurine of Phragann in his rituals, and wore it around his waist during sex. The two main sources differed in their naming of this object. Alan John referred to it as Pragngan, while Narayanan Govindan Kutty cited the police reports, calling it Phragann.) which Lim described as a Siamese sex god, were among the spiritual entities he called on in his rituals. Lim deceived his clients with several confidence tricks; his most effective gimmick, known as the "needles and egg" trick, duped many to believe that he had supernatural abilities. After blackening needles with soot from a burning candle, Lim carefully inserted them into a raw egg and sealed the hole with powder. In his rituals, he passed the egg several times over his client while chanting and asked her to crack open the egg. Unaware that the egg had been tampered with, the client would be convinced by the sight of the black needles that evil spirits were harassing her.

Claiming he had supernatural powers to solve their problems through rituals, he used the pretext of a massage to sexually assault his female clients. He would have the woman strip together with him, and would massage her body — including her genitals — with Phragann's idol, and proceed to rape her. Lim's treatments also included an electro-shock therapy based on that used on mental patients. After placing his client's feet in a tub of water and attaching wires to her temples, Lim passed electricity through her. The shocks, he assured her, would cure headaches and drive away evil spirits.

Lim used his fake powers to threaten and intimidate his female victims. He also used various types of abuse, such as isolation from family members and threats, to control the women and keep them trapped. Lim was extremely physically violent towards his partners; he would slam their heads against the wall, kick them and pull their hair. He also tortured them by electrocuting them. He coerced an 18-year-old student Christina Chong as well as Tan into prostitution. Between 1979 and 1981, he took about $120,000 from Chong after forcing her into the sex trade.

=== Catherine Tan Mui Choo ===
Born in 1953 or 1954, Catherine Tan Mui Choo (Chinese: 陈梅珠; pinyin: Chén Méizhū) was the eldest of four children. She was neglected by her parents who focused their attention on her brothers and sent her away at 13 years old to a vocational centre.

At 17 years old, Tan lost her grandmother, the only family member whom she was close to and was devoted to. Estranged from family, and young with little education and skills, the teenager started working at a bar to earn a living.

At 20 years old, she was referred by a coworker to Lim for help with depression and other ailments. Tan started visiting him regularly. In 1975, Lim, then 33 years old, insisted that the 21-year-old moved into his flat, where he was then living with his then-wife and two children. The wife moved out with their children a few days later, and divorced Lim in 1976.

Lim quit his Rediffusion job and became a full-time medium. He enjoyed brisk business, at one point receiving S$6,000–7,000 (US$2,838–3,311) (Note: The exchange rate is 2.11, based on averaging the 12 months of the exchange rates for 1981.) a month from a single client.

In June 1977, Lim and Tan registered their marriage. Lim was extremely abusive towards Tan, regularly torturing her with electric shocks, beatings, threats, and lies. Lim sexually exploited and financially abused Tan: he forced her into becoming a prostitute and a stripper, and took her earnings. She went into further depression, experiencing suicidal thoughts and a sense of worthlessness. Lim made Tan convince young female clients to sleep with him.

Lim's torture extended to Tan's younger siblings. Lim forced Tan's younger sister into having sex with him and Tan, and forced the girl into prostitution too. Demanding Tan to have sex with younger males to preserve her youth, Lim pressured her into having sex with her 16-year-old brother regularly for over one year. He also forced her into having sex with another teenager.

=== Hoe Kah Hong ===
Born on 10 September 1955, Hoe Kah Hong (Chinese: 何家凤; pinyin: Hé Jiāfèng) was the third of six children. At eight years old, when her father died, she was sent away from family to Penang, Malaysia, to live with her aunt. She returned to the family at 15 years old, and worked as a seamstress, factory-hand and a production operator for Hewlett Packard.

In 1978, Hoe married Benson Loh Ngak Hua.

In 1979, her mother brought 24-year-old Hoe and her sisters to get treatment from Lim. Lim used his usual tricks to convince them that he had supernatural powers.

To make Hoe one of his "holy wives", Lim started isolating Hoe from her family through lies, intimidation and abuse. He made up an array of bewildering lies, claiming: she was an illegitimate child; her family were immoral people who practised infidelity; her husband Loh would force her into prostitution. Hoe eventually underwent a mock wedding with Lim who declared her as his "holy wife". Three months after first meeting Lim, Hoe moved in with him and Tan.

Loh sought out his wife at Lim's flat and Lim, under the pretext of asking Loh to observe Hoe getting treatment, murdered Loh. Lim convinced Loh to participate in an electro-shock therapy. Lim applied a large voltage to Loh, electrocuting him to death, while Hoe was stunned into unconsciousness. Loh was 25 years old.

Lim made Hoe lie to the police that Loh was electrocuted when switching on a faulty electric fan. The coroner recorded an open verdict, indicating the circumstances of his death were unclear. The police made no further investigations. Lim later said he killed Loh so he could retain Hoe. He also blamed Hoe for the death, claiming an evil spirit in her had jumped out and killed Loh.

Hoe was deeply affected by Loh's death. She fell into depression; she started hearing voices and having hallucinations of Loh. At the end of May she was admitted to the Woodbridge Hospital for psychiatric treatment. Psychologists diagnosed her condition as schizophrenia and started appropriate treatments. By the first week of July, Hoe was discharged. Hoe moved back in with Lim, who would torture her with electric shocks.

She continued having follow-up checks at Woodbridge Hospital. Because she did not complain and did not show symptoms at the sessions, she was assessed as being in remission at the time of the killings.

== Rape charge ==
Lim continued his trade, tricking more women into giving him money and sex. He would use Tan and Hoe to help convince the women. At the time of his arrest, he had 40 "holy wives".

In late 1980 he was arrested and charged with raping Lucy Lau Kok Huang, a door-to-door cosmetic salesgirl, who had met Lim when she was promoting beauty products to Tan. On 19 October, Lim told Lau that a ghost was haunting her, but he could exorcise it with his sex rituals. Lau was unconvinced, and Lim decided to drug and rape her instead. Lim secretly mixed two capsules of Dalmadorm, a sedative, into a glass of milk and offered it to her, claiming it had holy properties. Lau became groggy after drinking it, which allowed Lim to rape her. For the next few weeks, he continued to abuse her by using drugs or threats.

Lau later filed a police report. Lim was arrested on charges of rape, and Tan for abetting him. When out on bail, Lim told Hoe to lie that she was present at the apartment when the rape happened but did not see any crime committed. This failed to stop the police enquiries; Lim and Tan had to extend their bail, in person, at the police station every fortnight. Lim described this as an inconvenience. He also could not accept that he was accused of rape as he saw himself as a "ladies' man" who was adored by women.

== Murders ==
Frustrated, Lim plotted to distract the police with a series of child murders. Moreover, he believed that sacrifices of children to the Hindu goddess Kali would help him escape the rape charge and other issues. Lim pretended to be possessed by Kali, and told Tan and Hoe that the goddess wanted them to kill children to wreak vengeance on Lau. He also told them that Phragann demanded that he have sex with their female victims.

Lim made Hoe find suitable victims. Hoe brought in three children separately on three occasions but Lim rejected them. The first of the three, a 10-year-old Indian girl, was rejected by Lim due to her race and that one of the gods he worshipped is Hindu; the second girl, a Chinese girl residing in Clementi, was also rejected because she was too skinny. Lim panicked when he saw the third target call a friend, and the girl had also told Lim that the friend she was calling had seen her walking away with Hoe.

On 24 January 1981, nine-year-old Agnes Ng was waiting at the Church of Risen Christ in Toa Payoh for her sister when Hoe took her. Lim had told Hoe that Agnes would grow up to be evil like Hoe's mother and cast spells on others unless she was killed. The trio gave Agnes food and drink that was laced with Dalmadorm. After Agnes became groggy and fell asleep, Lim sexually abused her. They pricked her finger and each of them took a sip. When Agnes went to the toilet, they killed her there. "I immersed her head in the tub of water. Lim stepped on Agnes' body while Catherine held her legs," said Hoe. Finally, Lim used his electro-shock therapy device to "make doubly sure that she was dead". They stuffed her body in a bag and dumped it near the lift at Block 11.

Lim then instructed Hoe that he wanted a boy next, and to find someone with money so he could collect ransom before the murder. Hoe said she chose Ghazali as he resembled her late husband Loh.

On 6 February 10-year-old Ghazali was at a playground with two cousins when Hoe approached him, asking for help to collect some things from a friend's house. Ghazali agreed to help, and followed her into a taxi. That was the last time he was seen alive. At the flat, Ghazali was drugged but he took a long time to fall asleep. Lim decided to tie up the boy as a precaution; however, the boy awoke and struggled. He was then knocked out. After drawing his blood, they proceeded to drown their victim. Ghazali struggled, vomiting and losing control of his bowels as he died. Blood kept streaming from his nose after his death. While Tan stayed behind to clean the flat, Lim and Hoe disposed of the body. The three tried to clean as much bloodstains as they could before sunrise. The police followed a trail of blood leading from Ghazali to the flat, and arrested the three.

== Trial ==
Two days after their arrest, Lim, Tan and Hoe were charged in the Subordinate Court for the murders of the two children. The trio were subjected to further interrogations by the police, and to medical examinations by prison doctors. On 16–17 September, their case was brought to the court for a committal procedure. To prove that there was a case against the accused, Deputy Public Prosecutor Glenn Knight called on 58 witnesses and arrayed 184 pieces of evidence before the magistrate. While Tan and Hoe denied the charges of murder, Lim pleaded guilty and claimed sole responsibility for the acts. The magistrate decided that the case against the accused was sufficiently strong to be heard at the High Court. Lim, Tan, and Hoe remained in custody while investigations continued.

=== Judiciary, prosecution, and defence ===
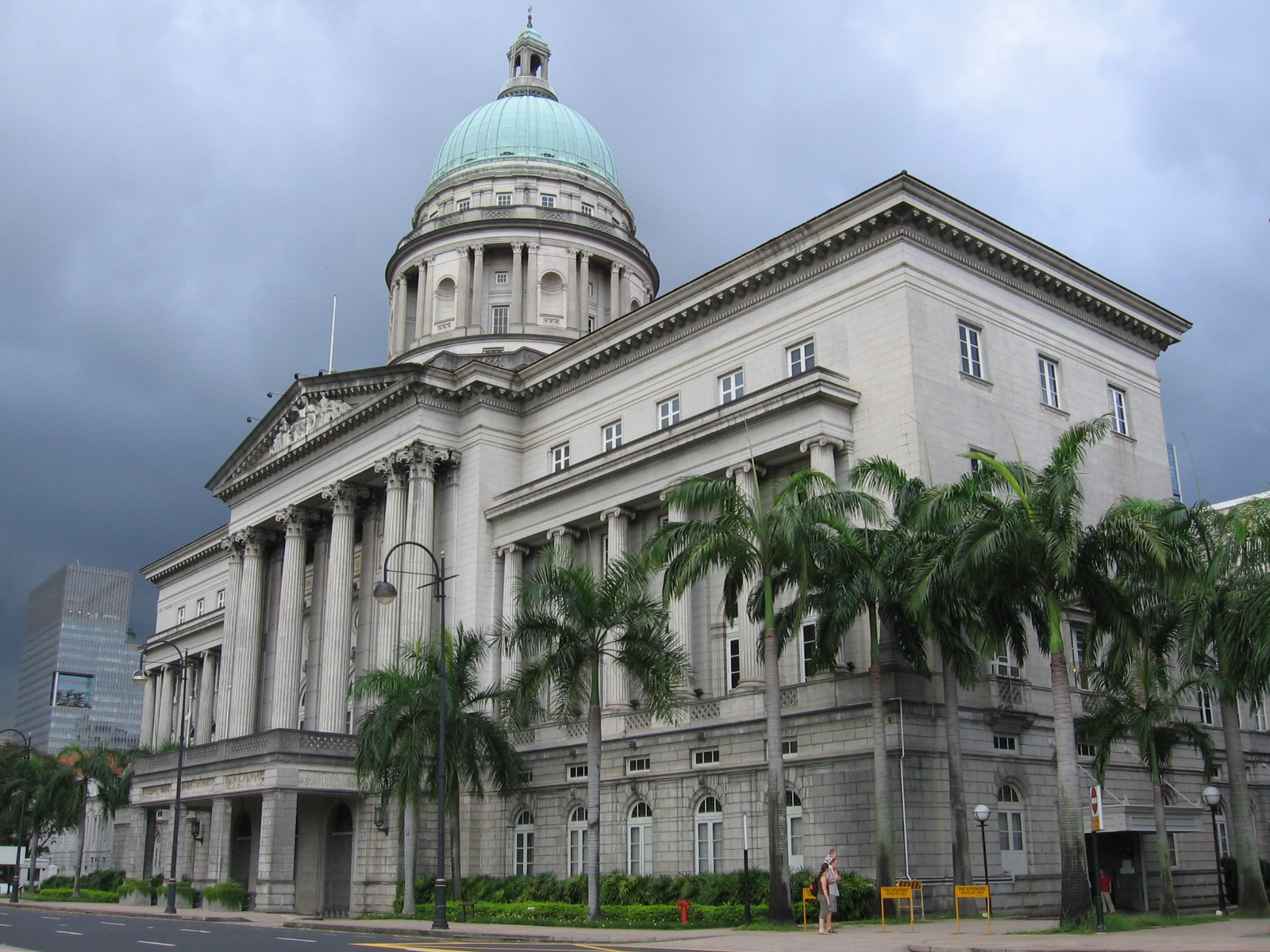
The murder case was heard in Courtroom No. 4 of the old Supreme Court Building.

The High Court was convened in the Supreme Court Building on 25 March 1983. Presiding over the case were two judges: Justice Thirugnana Sampanthar Sinnathuray, who would deliver judgment on serial murderer John Martin Scripps 12 years later, and Justice Frederick Arthur Chua, who was at the time the longest serving judge in Singapore. Knight continued to build his case on the evidence gathered by detective work. Photographs of the crime scenes, together with witness testimonies, would help the court to visualise the events that led to the crimes. Other evidence — the blood samples, religious objects, drugs, and the notes with Ng and Ghazali's names — conclusively proved the defendants' involvement. Knight had no eyewitnesses to the murders; his evidence was circumstantial, but he told the court in his opening statement, "What matters is that [the accused] did intentionally suffocate and drown these two innocent children, causing their deaths in circumstances which amount to murder. And this we will prove beyond all reasonable doubt."

Tan, with Lim's and the police's permission, used $10,000 of the $159,340 (US$4,730 of US$75,370) seized from the trio's flat to engage J. B. Jeyaretnam for her defence. Hoe had to accept the court's offer of counsel, receiving Nathan Isaac as her defender. Since his arrest, Lim had refused legal representation. He defended himself at the Subordinate Court hearings, but could not continue to do so when the case was moved to the High Court; Singapore law requires that for capital crimes the accused must be defended by a legal professional. Thus Howard Cashin was appointed as Lim's lawyer, although his job was complicated by his client's refusal to cooperate. The three lawyers decided not to dispute that their clients had killed the children. Acting on a defence of diminished responsibility, they attempted to show that their clients were not sound of mind and could not be held responsible for the killings. Had this defence been successful, all three defendants would have escaped the death penalty but be sentenced to either life imprisonment, or up to 10 years in jail for a reduced charge of culpable homicide not amounting to murder (or manslaughter) instead of murder.

=== Proceedings ===
Lim: No comment.
Justice Sinnathuray: No, no, no, Adrian Lim, you can't keep saying that to me. (To Cashin) He is your witness.
Cashin: You can see now, my Lord, how difficult it is with this witness.

— Court transcript illustrating the court's frustration with Lim's behaviour

After Knight had presented the prosecution evidence the court heard testimonies on the personalities and character flaws of the accused, from their relatives and acquaintances. Details of their lives were revealed by one of Lim's "holy wives". Private medical practitioners Dr. Yeo Peng Ngee and Dr. Ang Yiau Hua admitted that they were Lim's sources for drugs, and had provided the trio sleeping pills and sedatives without question on each consultation. (Note: Both doctors were disciplined for their actions by the Singapore Medical Council in 1990; Yeo was struck off the Medical Register, and Ang was suspended for three months. Yeo, however, successfully reapplied for his restoration in the following year.) The police and forensics teams gave their accounts of their investigations; Inspector Suppiah, the investigating officer-in-charge, read out the statements the defendants had made during their remand. In these statements Lim stated that he had killed for revenge, and that he had sodomised Ng. The accused had also confirmed in their statements that each was an active participant in the murders. There were many contradictions among these statements and the confessions made in court by the accused, but Judge Sinnathuray declared that despite the conflicting evidence, "the essential facts of this case are not in dispute". Lim's involvement in the crimes was further evidenced by Fung Joon Yong, a witness who vouched that just after midnight on 7 February 1981, at the ground floor of Block 12, he saw Lim and a woman walk past him carrying a dark-skinned boy.

On 13 April, Lim took the stand. He maintained that he was the sole perpetrator of the crimes. He denied that he raped Lucy Lau or Ng, claiming that he made the earlier statements only to satisfy his interrogators. Lim was selective in answering the questions the court threw at him; he verbosely answered those that agreed with his stance, and refused to comment on the others. When challenged on the veracity of his latest confession, he claimed that he was bound by religious and moral duty to tell the truth. Knight, however, countered that Lim was inherently a dishonest man who had no respect for oaths. Lim had lied to his wife, his clients, the police, and psychiatrists. Knight claimed Lim's stance in court was an open admission that he willingly lied in his earlier statements. Tan and Hoe were more cooperative, answering the questions posed by the court. They denied Lim's story, and vouched for the veracity of the statements they had given to the police. They told how they had lived in constant fear and awe of Lim; believing he had supernatural powers, they followed his every order and had no free will of their own. Under Knight's questioning, however, Tan admitted that Lim had been defrauding his customers, and that she had knowingly helped him to do so. Knight then got Hoe to agree that she was conscious of her actions at the time of the murders.

=== Battle of the government and private psychiatrists ===
In 2021, Justice Choo Han Teck, who was Cashin's associate during the case, said that in the 1980s, "People on the Government side (the Woodbridge) saw it as an almost defensive mechanism to disagree everything with the private psychiatrists". He also pointed out that it was difficult to even find private psychiatrists to testify in court. A senior psychiatrist in private practice Wong Yip Chong was the only one to do so and R. Nagulendran came along later.

R. Nagulendran, a consultant psychiatrist, testified that Tan was mentally impaired by reactive psychotic depression. Her depression worsened with the horrific physical, mental and sexual abuse she suffered at the hands of Lim over the years, including him forcing her to become a prostitute and a stripper so that he could use her earnings. The use of drugs also caused her to hallucinate and be susceptible to Lim's lies.

The prosecution's expert witness Chee Kuan Tsee—a psychiatrist at Woodbridge Hospital—believed that Tan was happy with the material lifestyle that Lim gave her and did not have the impression that Tan had an unhappy married life. Later during cross-examination by J.B. Jeyaretnam, he admitted that he disregarded Tan's abuse though he continued to insist that Tan was mentally sound during the killings. He felt if she was mentally unsound, she would have becoming increasingly neglectful of her personal appearance but instead had skincare and slimming treatments. Chee did not link this with how Lim's perverse demands for Tan to look youthful, even forcing her into depraved acts such as copulating with her own younger brother. Chee also alleged that Tan was happy with Lim providing her with "nice clothes, cosmetics, and whatever she needed", although it was already established that Lim had forced Hoe into prostitution and controlled all earnings that Tan was bringing in.

Both Nagulendran and Chee agreed that Hoe suffered from schizophrenia before she met Lim. After abuse from Tan, which included frequent electric shocks, Hoe's condition worsened to the point that she beat her mother and poured urine on her mother. Conversely, since the Woodbridge doctors thought she appeared well during her follow-up checks (16 July 1980 – 31 January 1981), Chee evaluated she was well at the time of the killings. Chee claimed that were Hoe as severely impaired by her condition as Nagulendran described, she would have been unable to work. But she had continued her factory work. Chee also believed that a mentally ill person is more likely to resist being controlled than a healthy person can, and concluded that he did not think that Hoe was controlled by Lim. Chee did not appear to have made any links between his diagnosis and Hoe's history of abuse by Tan, including being regularly tortured and witnessing Tan kill her husband.

Wong believed that Lim was mentally ill at the time of the crimes. He said that Lim's voracious sexual appetite and deluded belief in Kali were characteristics of a mild manic depression. He also said that only an unsound mind would dump the bodies close to his home when his plan was to distract the police. Chee Kuan Tsee said that Lim was "purposeful in his pursuits, patient in his planning and persuasive in his performance for personal power and pleasure". In Chee's opinion, Lim had indulged in sex because through his role as a medium he obtained a supply of women who were willing to go to bed with him. Furthermore, his belief in Kali was religious in nature, not delusional. Lim's use of religion for personal benefit indicated full self-control. Lastly, Lim had consulted doctors and freely taken sedatives to alleviate his insomnia, a condition which, according to Chee, sufferers from bipolar disorder fail to recognise.

=== Closing statements ===
Cashin declared that Lim was a normal man until his initiation into the occult, and that he was clearly divorced from reality when he entered the "unreasonable world of atrociousness", acting on his delusions to kill children in Kali's name.

Jeyaretnam pointed out that Tan had depression for a long time. On top of that, she was living in fear of Lim who had abused not just her but her family members too. These made it hard for her to feel able to say no to Lim.

Isaac concluded, "[Hoe's] schizophrenic mind accepted that if the children were killed, they would go to heaven and not grow up evil like her mother and others." Isaac criticised Dr Chee for failing to accept Hoe's symptoms as schizophrenia.

The prosecution started its closing speech by drawing attention to the "cool and calculating" manner in which the children were killed. Knight also argued that the accused could not have shared the same delusion, and only brought it up during the trial. The "cunning and deliberation" displayed in the acts could not have been done by a deluded person. Urging the judges to consider the ramifications of their verdict, Knight said: "My Lords, to say that Lim was less than a coward who preyed on little children because they could not fight back; killed them in the hope that he would gain power or wealth and therefore did not commit murder, is to make no sense of the law of murder. It would lend credence to the shroud of mystery and magic he has conjured up his practices and by which he managed to frighten, intimidate and persuade the superstitious, the weak and the gullible into participating in the most lewd and obscene acts."

Knight described that Tan helped with the killings because "she loved [Lim]", and that Hoe was misled and did not have a mental illness.

=== Verdict ===
On 25 May 1983, crowds massed outside the building, waiting for the outcome of the trial. Due to limited seating, only a few were allowed inside to hear Justice Sinnathuray's delivery of the verdict, which took 15 minutes. The two judges were not convinced that the three defendants were mentally volatile during the crimes.

They found Lim to be "abominable and depraved" in carrying out his schemes. Viewing her interviews with the expert witnesses as admissions of guilt, Sinnathuray and Chua decided that Tan was an "artful and wicked person", and a "willing [party] to [Lim's] loathsome and nefarious acts". The judges found Hoe to be "simple" and "easily influenced". Although she suffered from schizophrenia, they opined that she was in a state of remission during the murders, hence she should bear full responsibility for her actions.

All three defendants were found guilty of murder and received mandatory death sentences, which was the only available punishment allowed for murder under Singapore law at that time. The two women did not react to their sentences. Lim beamed and cried, "Thank you, my Lords!" as he was led out.

=== Appeals from Tan and Hoe ===
Lim accepted his punishment and gave up his right to appeal, but the women appealed against their sentences. Tan hired Francis Seow to appeal for her, and the court again assigned Isaac to Hoe. The lawyers asked the appeal court to reconsider the mental states of their clients during the murders, charging that the trial judges in their deliberations had failed to consider this point. The Court of Criminal Appeal reached their decision in August 1986. The appeal judges which consist of Chief Justice Wee Chong Jin, Justice Lai Kew Chai and Justice L P Thean reaffirmed the decision of their trial counterparts, noting that as finders of facts, judges have the right to discount medical evidence in the light of evidence from other sources. (Note: The Privy Council gave a similar ruling in their review of Walton v. the Queen, a 1989 British murder trial.) Tan and Hoe's further appeals to London's Privy Council and Singapore President Wee Kim Wee met with similar failures.

=== Final days and hanging of the murderers ===
While on death row at Changi Prison, the trio were counselled by Catholic priests and nuns.

Lim refused to see a counsellor for most of his time on death row.

Tan and Hoe had Sister Gerard Fernandez as their spiritual counsellor. Tan was already known to Fernandez who operated the vocational centre that Tan attended as a youth. In 1983, Gerard Fernandez contacted Tan who wrote, "Sister, how could you love me after what I have done?", signing off as a "black sheep". The nun converted both women to Catholicism. Tan began to spend hours in prayer, while Hoe was baptized.

The week before the execution date, Lim joined in, asking for repentance. He asked Australian priest Brian Doro for absolution. In their final days, all three of them received a Holy Communion. On 25 November 1988, the trio were given their last meal and led to the hangman's noose. Lim smiled throughout his last walk to the gallows. At 06:00, the trio were executed by long drop hanging and later pronounced dead. After the sentences were carried out, the three murderers were given a short Catholic funeral mass by Doro, and cremated on the same day.

=== Commentaries years later ===
Twenty years after the trio were executed, Nathan Isaac, the former lawyer of Hoe Kah Hong, died on 10 January 2009, 14 days short of his 72nd birthday. Isaac was survived by his wife, four sons and two grandsons; one of his sons recalled his father's experience of defending Hoe during the trial. Isaac's son stated that his father was saddened by not saving Hoe from the gallows, as he believed that Hoe was misled and manipulated into committing the murders by Lim, and felt that Hoe did not deserve the death penalty as Lim did.

In 2021, Justice Choo Han Teck, who was Cashin's associate during the case, said that in the 1980s, "People on the Government side (the Woodbridge) saw it as an almost defensive mechanism to disagree everything with the private psychiatrists". He also pointed out that it was difficult to even find private psychiatrists to testify in court; Wong Yip Chong was the only one to do so and Nagulendran came along later.

Even in the short period of time interacting with Lim for the trial, Choo, Cashin and Wong found Lim volatile and difficult.

== Legacy ==
The trial on the Toa Payoh ritual murders was closely followed by the populace of Singapore. Throngs of people constantly packed the grounds of the courts, hoping to catch a glimpse of Adrian Lim and to hear the revelations first-hand. Canon Frank Lomax, Vicar of St. Andrew's Anglican Church, complained to The Straits Times that the gory and sexually explicit reports of Lim's crimes could have a corrupting effect on the young. Others welcomed the open reporting, considering it helpful in raising public awareness of the need for vigilance of crime.

Books, which covered the murders and the trial, were quickly bought by the public on their release. The Straits Times journalist Alan John wrote about the case in his book Unholy Trinity. He was, and still is, one of the few voices in Singapore pointing out how Singapore's society and system, by believing that domestic violence is a private family matter, had enabled the extreme domestic violence in this case to go unchecked. All royalties from the 1989 edition went to suicide prevention agency Samaritans of Singapore, royalties from the 2016 edition, went to domestic violence prevention agency Pave.

Revelations from the trial had cast Lim as evil incarnate in the minds of Singaporeans. Some citizens could not believe that anyone would willingly defend such a man. They called Cashin to voice their anger; a few even issued death threats against him. On the other hand, the case boosted Knight's career. He handled more high-profile cases, and became the director of the Commercial Affairs Department in 1984. He was later found guilty of corruption and convicted seven years later. Knight, who was subsequently convicted a second time for corruption in 1998, was later allowed to return to practice as a lawyer in 2007 and he died in 2025 at the age of 80.

Even in prison, Lim was hated; his fellow prisoners abused and treated him as an outcast. In the years that followed the crime, memories remained fresh among those who followed the case. Journalists deemed it the most sensational trial of the 80s, being "the talk of a horrified city as gruesome accounts of sexual perversion, the drinking of human blood, spirit possession, exorcism and indiscriminate cruelty unfolded during the 41-day hearing". Fifteen years from the trial's conclusion, a poll conducted by The New Paper reported that 30 per cent of its respondents had picked the Toa Payoh ritual murders as the most horrible crime, despite the paper's request to vote only for crimes committed in 1998.

During the 1990s, the local film industry made two movies based on the murder case, the first of which was Medium Rare. The 1991 production had substantial foreign involvement; most of the cast and crew were American or British. The script was locally written and intended to explore the "psyche of the three main characters". The director, however, focused on sex and violence, and the resulting film was jeered by the audience at its midnight screening. Its 16-day run brought in $130,000 (US$75,145), (Note: In comparison, the 1996 box-office comedy hit Army Daze took in $500,000 (US$289,017) for its first four days. Exchange rate of 1.73 is derived from a 12-month average for 1991.) and a reporter called it "more bizarre than the tales of unnatural sex and occult practices associated with the Adrian Lim story". The second film, 1997's God or Dog, also had a dismal box-office performance despite a more positive critical reception. Both shows had difficulty in finding local actors for the lead role; Zhu Houren declined on the basis that Adrian Lim was too unique a personality for an actor to portray accurately, and Xie Shaoguang rejected the role for the lack of "redeeming factors" in the murderer. On the television, the murder case would have been the opening episode for True Files, a crime awareness programme in 2002. The public, however, complained that the trailers were too gruesome with the re-enactments of the rituals and murders, forcing the media company MediaCorp to reshuffle the schedule. The Toa Payoh ritual murders episode was replaced by a less sensational episode as the opener and pushed back into a later timeslot for more mature viewers, marking the horrific nature of the crimes committed by Lim, Tan, and Hoe.

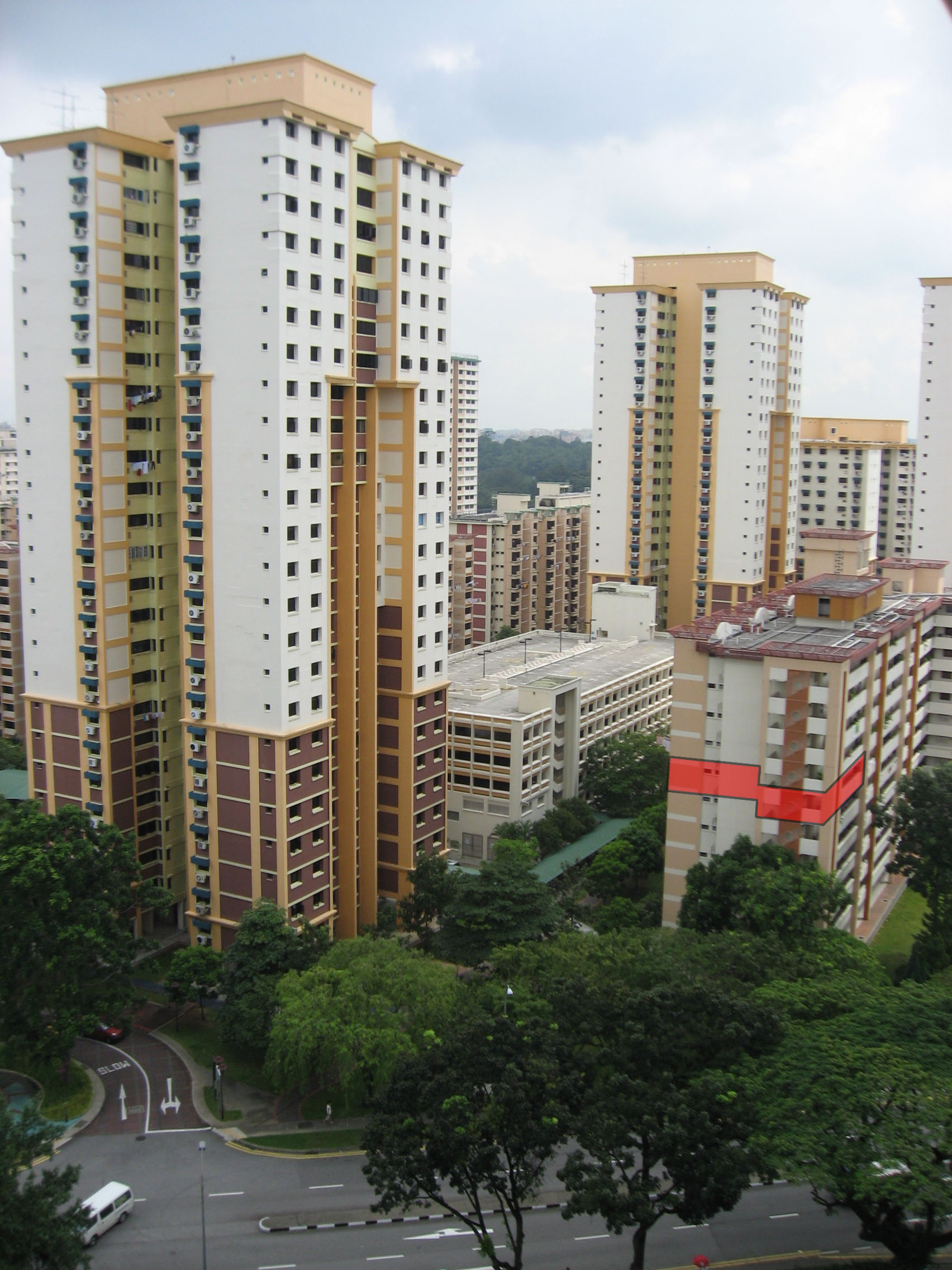
Lim's flat (highlighted in red) was in Block 12 (right), Toa Payoh Lorong 7. By 2008, the neighbouring Blocks 10 and 11 (centre and left) had been replaced with taller structures.

Also, in the aftermath of the case, Lim's flat became vacant from the day he was arrested. For six years, there was no one living in it given the traditional Asians' fear of haunted places at the crime scenes that involved unnatural deaths or murder. It was only in 1987 when a Catholic family moved into the flat. The neighbourhood area where Lim resided was also redeveloped over the years and while the flat remained there, its neighbouring infrastructure were replaced with newer, taller buildings.

In July 2015, Singapore's national daily newspaper The Straits Times published an e-book titled Guilty As Charged: 25 Crimes That Have Shaken Singapore Since 1965, which included the Adrian Lim murders as one of the top 25 crimes that shocked the nation since its independence in 1965. The book was borne out of collaboration between the Singapore Police Force and the newspaper. The paperback edition of the book was published and first hit the bookshelves in end-June 2017. The paperback edition first entered the ST bestseller list on 8 August 2017, a month after its publication.

28 years after the executions of the killers, on 25 November 2016, the New Paper interviewed Ghazali's mother, 66-year-old Daliah Aim, who agreed to speak about her son's death after 36 years since Ghazali's murder. Daliah told the reporters that even till today, she remained heartbroken over her eldest child's death and could not get over the unfortunate fate that befell on Ghazali, and she reportedly wept a few times while speaking to the reporters. The mother of three also told the paper that when she received news of Ghazali being killed, she was so full of grief that she had to be sedated, and often, for the next 34 years until 2014, she suffered from frequent fainting spells. Daliah said that her family members tried to persuade her to let go of the past, but she said she could not and told them they would never understand the anguish she had over her son's demise. One of Daliah's four grandchildren, a 19-year-old student, also said in the interview that he only learned of his connection his uncle Ghazali when ten years prior, his mother told him about Ghazali as they were watching a television crime show which re-enacted the Adrian Lim murders. He stated he was angered at the way his uncle died and regarded Adrian Lim and Lim's two women as monsters. Daliah similarly expressed that she never forgave the three murderers for taking away her son's life.

The 2018 short film Sister by film-maker Chai Yee Wei dramatized the counselling of Catherine Tan Mui Choo and Hoe Kah Hong by Sister Gerard Fernandez while on death row and the final moments before their execution.

In November 2023, another Singaporean crime show Inside Crime Scene re-enacted the Adrian Lim murders, and the re-adaptation aired as the third episode of the show's second season; the episode had a second segment which also featured the Stirling Road murder of 2007.

== See also ==
- Capital punishment in Singapore
- Andrew Road triple murders
- Kovan double murders
- Murder of Nonoi
- Oriental Hotel murder
- List of major crimes in Singapore
- List of serial killers by country

== Bibliography ==
Books

- DeBernadi, Jean (2006). "Introduction". The Way that Lives in the Heart: Chinese Popular Religion and Spirit Mediums in Penang, Malaysia. California: Stanford University Press. ISBN 0-8047-5292-3.
- Guneratne, Anthony (2003). "The Urban and the Urbane: Modernization, Modernism, and the Rebirth of the Singaporean Cinema". In Goh, Robbie; Yeoh, Brenda (eds.). Theorizing the Southeast Asian City as Text: Urban Landscapes, Cultural Documents and Interpretative Experiences. Singapore: World Scientific. ISBN 981-238-283-6.
- Humphreys, Neil (2006). Final Notes from a Great Island: A Farewell Tour of Singapore. Singapore: Marshall Cavendish. ISBN 981-261-318-8.
- John, Alan (1989). Unholy Trinity: The Adrian Lim 'Ritual' Child Killings. Singapore: Times Book International. ISBN 9971-65-205-6.
- John, Alan (2016). Unholy Trinity. Marshall Cavendish International Asia. ISBN 978-981-4634-50-2.
- Kok Lee Peng; Cheng, Molly; Chee Kuan Tsee (1990). Diminished Responsibility: With Special Reference to Singapore. Singapore: National University of Singapore Press. ISBN 9971-69-138-8.
- Kok Lee Peng; Cheng, Molly; Chee Kuan Tsee (1994). Mental Disorders and the Law. Singapore: National University of Singapore Press. ISBN 9971-69-188-4.
- Kutty, Narayanan Govindan (1989). Adrian Lim's Beastly Killings. Singapore: Aequitas Management Consultants. ISBN 981-00-0931-3.
- Millet, Raphael (2006). "From Survival to Revival". Singapore Cinema. Singapore: Editions Didier Millet. ISBN 981-4155-42-X.
- Naren Chitty (2000). "A Matrix Model for Framing News Media Reality". In Abbas Malek (ed.). The Global Dynamics of News: Studies in International News Coverage and News Agenda. Connecticut: Greenwood Publishing Group. ISBN 1-56750-462-0.
- Quah, Stella (1987). "Sense of Security". Friends in Blue: The Police and the Public in Singapore. Selangor, Malaysia: Oxford University Press. ISBN 0-19-588854-5.
- Rowen, Henry (1998). "Singapore's Model of Development: Is It Transferable?". Behind East Asian Growth: The Political and Social Foundations of Prosperity. London, United Kingdom: Taylor and Francis. ISBN 0-415-16520-2.
- Sit Yin Fong (1989a). I Confess. Singapore: Heinemann Asia. ISBN 9971-64-191-7. (court transcripts)
- Sit Yin Fong (1989b). Was Adrian Lim Mad?. Singapore: Heinemann Asia. ISBN 9971-64-192-5. (court transcripts)
- Thung Syn Neo (1977). "Needs and Community Services in Housing Estates". In Hodge, Peter (ed.). Community Problems and Social Work in Southeast Asia: The Hong Kong and Singapore Experience. Hong Kong: Hong Kong University Press. ISBN 962-209-022-2.
- Trocki, Carl (2006). "The Managed, Middle-class, Multiracial Society". Singapore: Wealth, Power and the Culture of Control. Oxfordshire, United Kingdom: Routledge. ISBN 0-415-26385-9.
- Uhde, Jan; Uhde, Yvonne (2000). "The Revival". Latent Images: Film in Singapore. Selangor, Malaysia: Oxford University Press. ISBN 0-19-588714-X.

News articles

- Alkhatib, Shaffiq (25 November 2016). "So grief-stricken, I had to be sedated: Woman breaks silence 35 years after son killed by infamous murderer Adrian Lim". The Straits Times.
- Davidson, Ben (2 January 1990). "Trials that rocked Singapore in the '80s" (fee required). The Straits Times. Singapore: Singapore Press Holdings. p. 17.
- Davie, Sandra (24 November 1989). "Father Brian Doro" (fee required). The Straits Times. Singapore: Singapore Press Holdings. p. 32.
- Fernandez, Ivan (25 June 1990). "Action against docs in Adrian Lim case: Diagnose the delay" (fee required). The New Paper. Singapore: Singapore Press Holdings. p. 12.
- Ho, Olivia (8 August 2017). "Guilty As Charged: 25 crimes that shook Singapore". The Straits Times. Archived from the original on 2017-08-11.
- John, Alan (21 February 2016b). "'Sister, how could you love me after what I have done?'". The Straits Times.
- Khor, Christine (13 September 1989a). "Big sweep by Singaporean works" (fee required). The Straits Times. Singapore: Singapore Press Holdings. p. S2.2.
- Khor, Christine (16 October 1989b). "Book bang" (fee required). The Straits Times. Singapore: Singapore Press Holdings. p. S2.1.
- Lee Yin Luen (9 May 1996a). "Too evil to explore" (fee required). The New Paper. Singapore: Singapore Press Holdings. p. 26.
- Lee Yin Luen (4 June 1996b). "Actor gives up Adrian Lim role" (fee required). The New Paper. Singapore: Singapore Press Holdings. p. 8.
- Lim, Trudy (10 October 1991). "Adrian Lim doc back at work" (fee required). The New Paper. Singapore: Singapore Press Holdings. p. 15.
- Low, Calvin (19 December 1998). "You, Q & eh?" (fee required). The New Paper. Singapore: Singapore Press Holdings. p. S3.
- Tan, Jeanmarie (24 April 2002). "Adrian Lim trailer too 'horrific'..." (fee required). The New Paper. Singapore: Singapore Press Holdings. p. 16.
- Tan Ooi Boon (20 April 1997a). "Defence that's too tough to prove" (fee required). The Straits Times. Singapore: Singapore Press Holdings. p. 25.
- Tan Ooi Boon (7 October 1997b). "Justice Sinnathuray retires" (fee required). The Straits Times. Singapore: Singapore Press Holdings. p. 2.
- Tan Ooi Boon; Lim Seng Jin (20 September 1998). "Law enforcer got a taste of own medicine" (fee required). The Straits Times. Singapore: Singapore Press Holdings. p. 16.
- The Straits Times (14 May 2016a). "Guilty As Charged: Shocking crimes that have shaken Singapore since 1965". The Straits Times. Archived from the original on 2016-05-15.
- The Straits Times (15 May 2016b). "Guilty As Charged: Adrian Lim and his 2 'holy' wives kidnapped, tortured and killed 2 children". The Straits Times. Archived from the original on 2016-05-17.
- Vijayan, K. C. (14 December 2002). "Man who lured wife to her murder hanged" (fee required). The Straits Times. Singapore: Singapore Press Holdings. p. 1.
- Yap, Sonny (15 July 1995). "Of human interest" (fee required). The Straits Times. Singapore: Singapore Press Holdings. p. B3.
- Yaw Yan Chong; Ang, Dave (10 September 1991). "Jack: No prisoner liked Adrian Lim" (fee required). The New Paper. Singapore: Singapore Press Holdings. p. 6.

Online sources

- Capital Punishment U.K. "The Tao Payoh ritual murders in Singapore". Capital Punishment U.K.
- Economagic.com. "Singapore / U.S. Foreign Exchange Rate: Singapore Dollars to One U.S. Dollar (Jan-1981 – May-2008 )". Republic of South Africa: Department: Trade and Industry. Archived from the original on 2009-02-14.
- Foo Kim Leng (21 April 2021). "The Toa Payoh Ritual Murders 40 Years On (Part 2)". Blog. Singapore Academy of Law.
- John, Alan (17 February 2016a). "Singapore's most bizarre murder case". Alan John.
- John, Alan (13 January 2019). "What murderer Adrian Lim's wife Catherine Tan Mui Choo told Death Row counsellor Sister Gerard Fernandez: 'Sister, how could you love me after what I have done?'". Alan John.
- "The Trial Of Adrian Lim". True Files. Season 1. Episode 1 – via meWATCH.
- "The heinous crime that shook the nation - The Adrian Lim Murders | | True Crime". 25 November 2019 – via YouTube.
