= Sister Gerard Fernandez =

Roman Catholic nun

- Born: 1 January 1938 (age 88); Straits Settlements (Singapore)
- Occupation: Nun

Ecclesiastical career
- Religion: Catholicism
- Church: Congregation of Our Lady of Charity of the Good Shepherd

Gerard Fernandez (born 1938) is a Roman Catholic religious sister, best known for her work as a death row counsellor in Singapore.

In over 40 years' career, Fernandez worked with 18 inmates on death row, some of the most notable of whom were Catherine Tan Mui Choo, and Hoe Kah Hong, the women accomplices of Adrian Lim in the murders of two children, and Filipina double murderer Flor Contemplacion.

== Career ==
Fernandez said that at the age of six her father had her recite a verse "And I commit you to Sing Sing Prison, there to be hanged, drawn and quartered" as an enunciation drill. Shocked, she recited a prayer instead. At the age of 18, she joined the Good Shepherd Sisters, a Roman Catholic order of nuns, at their convent in Marymount. Sister Gerard undertook teacher training and taught primary school pupils at the convent from 1959 to 1962, and thereafter went on a mission to Jakarta for four years to work with troubled teenagers. She returned to Jakarta for another mission in 1972. When she returned to Singapore three years later, she founded the Roman Catholic Prison Ministry and began counselling incarcerated drug offenders. Through this work, Sister Gerard offered counselling to convicts on death row, and over the next few decades, she accompanied 18 condemned prisoners on their final walk to the execution chamber.

== Media ==
In 2018, the short film Sister by Chai Yee Wei showed Sister Gerard and her counselling of Catherine Tan Mui Choo and Hoe Kah Hong before their deaths.

In May 2019, Gerard gave a two-hour oral history interview to the Singapore Academy of Law, where she talked about her own life and the various condemned inmates she counselled while they were on death row in Changi Prison. In the recordings, she also described the final moments of prisoners such as Flor Contemplacion and Van Tuong Nguyen as she walked with them to the gallows on the morning of their executions.

== Awards ==
She is the first Singaporean woman to be included in the BBC's 2019 list of 100 Women, the most inspiring women across the globe.
