= Flor Contemplacion =

Filipino domestic worker executed for a double murder in Singapore (1995)

- Contemplacion after her arrest in 1991
- Born: Flor Ramos Contemplacion; 7 January 1953; San Pablo, Laguna, Philippines
- Died: 17 March 1995 (aged 42); Changi Prison, Singapore
- Resting place: San Pablo Memorial Park; San Pablo, Laguna, Philippines
- Citizenship: Philippine citizen
- Occupation: Domestic worker
- Status: Executed by hanging
- Convictions: 2 counts of murder
- Penalty: Death

Details
- Victims: 2
- Date: 4 May 1991
- Country: Singapore
- Locations: Gangsa Road, Bukit Panjang
- Date apprehended: 4 May 1991

Flor Ramos Contemplacion (7 January 1953 – 17 March 1995) was a Filipina domestic worker who was executed in Singapore after being convicted of murdering a fellow Filipina maid and the four-year-old boy whom she was babysitting. At the time, her case as well as her eventual sentencing severely strained diplomatic relations between the Philippines and Singapore.

== Biography ==
Flor Contemplacion was born in San Pablo in Laguna province of Luzon, and was the second youngest of ten children. Her father died when she was 7 years old, and due to the increased financial pressure on her rural family she moved to Manila to live with an elder sister when she was 10 years old. Contemplacion dropped out of school aged 12 and soon after began working as a housemaid. Contemplacion got married in 1972 when she was 19 years old and eventually had four children. Her husband walked out on the family in 1987, leaving Contemplacion as the sole breadwinner. In 1988, she travelled to Singapore in search of work to support her young family, eventually finding employment as a domestic servant in the Cardiff Road area of Serangoon. Contemplacion often worked seven days a week from 6am until midnight, doing household chores and looking after her employer's child.

== Background to arrest ==
On 4 May 1991, Della M. Maga (born on 6 October 1955, in Tarlac), a 35-year-old Filipino migrant domestic worker, was found strangled to death in a five-bedroom apartment on the ninth floor of HDB Block 147 on Gangsa Road in Bukit Panjang. A four-year-old boy, Nicholas Huang Haoren Wong, whom Maga had been taking care of, was discovered lying next to her having been drowned in a bucket of water. The victims' bodies were discovered by Huang's parents, who had employed Maga for the previous 4 years, after they had arrived home to their apartment shortly after 1pm. Their two-year-old daughter was located unharmed in Maga's locked bedroom.

Singaporean police investigating the crime scene found no signs of a struggle or any ransacking of the flat, which, combined with the fact the front door grille was locked when the owners returned home, suggested that Maga knew her killer and granted them entry to the apartment. Interviews with neighbor Lucrecia Galuga revealed that she last saw Maga and the two children alive at 10am, and Maga had mentioned that a friend was due to visit her later on that morning. Detectives then began to identify, locate and question all of Maga's known associates in Singapore.

At around 7pm, police arrested 38-year-old Filipino citizen Flor Ramos Contemplacion at HDB Block 633 on Veerasamy Road in Kallang, after eliminating all other suspects from their enquiries. Contemplacion was found in possession of luxury items (seven watches, a Konica Minolta brand camera and a pearl necklace) that were believed to have been stolen from Maga. Investigations revealed that Contemplacion had visited Maga at the apartment in Bukit Panjang several times before and had met Nicholas Huang on those occasions. This fact raised the possibility that Contemplacion killed Huang and Maga to prevent her being identified, however the life of the two-year-old girl was spared as she was unable to speak due to her young age.

During her interrogation by the police, Contemplacion claimed to have left her employer's house on Cardiff Road the previous morning to deliver a package to her niece at Don Long Mansion in Katong, but she was not at home when Contemplacion arrived. However, when the police contacted the owner of the apartment to check Contemplacion's alibi he denied she had visited the property. On the afternoon of 6 May 1991, Contemplacion finally confessed to killing both victims and gave two statements to police via a Tagalog interpreter. That evening, investigating officers brought Contemplacion and the interpreter to the crime scene on Gangsa Road, where she described to the detectives how she was admitted to the apartment by Maga and what happened inside on the day of the murders. On 7 May 1991, Contemplacion was charged with the double murder of Della Maga and Nicholas Huang and then remanded in custody to await trial.

== Trial ==
On 26 January 1993, Contemplacion's trial began in the High Court of Singapore before Justice T. S. Sinnathuray. In her opening speech, Deputy Public Prosecutor Kamala Ponnampalam described how the victim's dead bodies were discovered by Huang's parents, who after failing to resuscitate Nicholas then called the police. Investigating officers examined Maga's personal diary and discovered the name and address of Flor Contemplacion, who was then located and questioned. Testimony by forensic pathologist Doctor Wee Keng Poh revealed that Maga died from asphyxia due to strangulation and Huang's death had been caused by drowning. According to the expert witness, another person had used an elastic cord wound around Maga's neck to apply moderate force for approximately 5 minutes, while the immersion of a young child's face in water for a similar time would cause them to drown.

Contemplacion's lawyer Ng Wing Cheong challenged the admissibility of five statements she gave to police after her arrest, asserting that they were made under duress while she was fatigued after hours of intensive questioning by detectives. During cross examination, Contemplacion claimed police used a picture of the Virgin Mary to frighten her into incriminating herself, as being a Catholic her belief was sinners would not go to Heaven. Contemplacion also claimed she was not informed of her right to have a lawyer present prior to giving the statements, and that detectives shouted and screamed at her that she would be hanged if she did not tell the truth.

However, Contemplacion conceded to the prosecutor that all statements were made voluntarily without any threat, inducement or promise being made before or during the recording of the statements by Tagalog interpreter Aurora Navarro (who was provided by the Philippine Embassy in Singapore) or herself. DPP Ponnampalam countered there was no evidence the Special Investigations Section had such a picture in their office, and that the police officers who interrogated Contemplacion confirmed that no pictures were shown to her during her questioning. Justice Sinnathuray therefore ruled all five statements were given voluntarily and could be admitted as evidence.

The prosecution thereafter submitted as evidence the statements made by Contemplacion, where she described making friends with Maga in June 1990. On the morning of the murders, Contemplacion went to the apartment in Bukit Panjang to meet Maga, as she wanted to hand over a parcel that Maga would deliver to her parents during her upcoming holiday to the Philippines. However, Maga refused to take the package with her, saying it was too heavy to bring on the airplane. While Contemplacion was talking to Maga, she suddenly had a psychotic episode where she broke out into a cold sweat and felt the urge to harm Maga. Contemplacion then strangled Maga from behind with an elastic cord and when she was dead dragged her body into a bathroom. There she discovered Nicholas playing with toys in a bucket of water, and Contemplacion grasped him by the upper body and dunked his head under the water until he stopped moving. Contemplacion then grabbed some of Maga's possessions and fled the apartment.

At the close of the prosecution's case, Justice Sinnathuray declared that prima facie evidence had been established against the accused and called on Contemplacion to make her defence against the charge of murdering Maga and Huang. However, when called to the stand, Contemplacion opted to remain silent. Sinnathuray warned Contemplacion that if the prosecution's case was unrebutted it would warrant a conviction on both murder charges, and her legal team also explained the consequences to her. When Sinnathuray thereafter invited the defence legal team to rebut the accusations against Contemplacion, her lead counsel Ng Wing Cheong informed the court that in light of his client's refusal to give evidence he had decided not to call any witnesses or make any submissions on her behalf either. DPP Ponnampalam also declined to present any arguments due to the stance of the defence team.

== Verdict ==
On the afternoon of 29 January 1993, Contemplacion was found guilty as charged and sentenced to death for the murder of Della Maga and Nicholas Huang, in accordance with Section 302 of the Penal Code of Singapore. Justice T.S Sinnathuray remarked that he was "satisfied beyond all reasonable doubt" that the prosecution had proved their case against her. When the death sentence was announced, Contemplacion broke down into tears and was so distraught she had to be supported by two prison officers as she was led from the dock.

== Appeals ==
On 26 January 1994, defence lawyer Sant Singh raised the defence of diminished responsibility during a hearing at the Court of Appeal in regards to Contemplacion's conviction, stating that the issue of her mental state was never raised during her original trial and new exculpatory evidence had since come to light regarding her psychiatric condition during the murders. An affidavit containing observations from Gleneagles Hospital consultant psychiatrist Doctor Terence Burke, who had studied the case in detail and since examined Contemplacion personally, was requested to be submitted by Singh. The appeal judges thereafter suspended the hearing and ordered that the original trial judge re-open the case and review the new evidence.

=== Retrial ===
On 25 April 1994, Justice T. S. Sinnathuray heard arguments in the High Court regarding Contemplacion's appeal. Taking the stand to give evidence in her own defence, Contemplacion claimed to have suffered from seizures from an early age, which gave her bouts of headaches and uncontrollable shaking. She also claimed that on the day of the murders a mysterious "voice" instructed her to visit Maga at the Bukit Panjang apartment. Contemplacion testified that on the way to the apartment she began to feel strange and started trembling all over. When she got there Maga appeared to be half her normal size and then looked like she was "shrinking". Contemplacion suddenly realised she was gripping an elastic cord that was wrapped around Maga's neck and ran into the bathroom to vomit. There she saw a young boy playing with water and he looked "like a small cat" to her. Contemplacion claimed she could not control herself, and she picked up the child then submerged his head in the bucket of water. Contemplacion asserted that she was suffering from severe psychiatric issues at the time of the killings, and was not guilty of murder but was admitting to manslaughter.

Testimony from Doctor Terence Burke asserted that Contemplacion suffered from a form of epilepsy known as a partial complex seizure, which was a mental illness that significantly impaired her responsibility for her actions on the day in question. Doctor Burke also testified that her low IQ and lack of education meant it was highly unlikely that Contemplacion would have been able to fabricate the symptoms of epilepsy. Deputy Public Prosecutor P.S. Raj argued that Contemplacion was simply suffering from a migraine on the day of the murders, adding that she had been examined previously by the consultant psychiatrist of Changi Prison hospital, Doctor Chan Khim Yew, and was determined to have no abnormality of the mind that would impair her mental reasoning abilities.

DPP Raj also highlighted that Contemplacion had not mentioned hearing voices or having hallucinations in any of her statements to the police after her arrest nor to Doctor Chan Khim Yew during his psychiatric examinations, having first reported these issues during interviews with Doctor Burke after her conviction and only submitting them in her defence during her retrial, which lead the court to consider her claims as fabrications and an exaggeration of a mild headache. DPP Raj further asserted that the evidence of Doctor Chan Khim Yew should take precedence over the testimony of Doctor Burke, as Contemplacion had first been examined by Doctor Chan Khim Yew a month after the murders and he had kept her under observation over 18 months throughout her detention in remand prison, whereas Doctor Burke had only had 4 interviews with her after she had been convicted. Doctor Chan Khim Yew also had years of previous experience on examining patients and then giving evidence on the issue of diminished responsibility, where as Doctor Burke had never testified on a case regarding diminished responsibility before, the DPP added.

After deliberation, the judge rejected Contemplacion's testimony and confirmed her earlier death sentence, ruling that she did not suffer from any serious mental illness at the time of the double homicide, that she only displayed symptoms of a mild migraine, and that she had consciously and deliberately murdered both victims. The court's judgement noted that the comprehensiveness of Contemplacion's actions in the apartment, such as using two different methods to silently kill each victim and locking the youngest child in a bedroom to prevent the sound of her crying alerting any bystanders, coupled with her ability to remember the events of that day in clear detail, proved that she was not suffering from a partial complex seizure during the time of the murders. The fact that both women had argued over the size of the package Maga refused to take with her to the Philippines on Contemplacion's behalf was attributed as a more likely motive for the fatal attack, according to the judge.

Justice Sinnathuray also highlighted that both Doctors Burke and Chan Khim Yew had agreed that a person suffering a partial complex seizure would have no recollection of the events that occurred during the episode, where as Contemplacion had given a vivid and detailed step by step account of what happened in Della's flat on the day of the murders, therefore her testimony satisfied him beyond reasonable doubt that she did not suffer from partial complex seizure at that time. The judge likewise dismissed claims that Contemplacion was unintelligent, as having witnessed her nimble performance during cross examination over several days he considered her a wilful and cunning person.

=== Appeal of Conviction ===
On 19 September 1994, Contemplacion's appeal against her conviction was rejected by Singapore's Court of Criminal Appeal. Defence lawyer Sant Singh argued that while the circumstances of the double murder she was convicted of were not in dispute, the original trial judge had erred in ruling the symptoms described by Contemplacion as a mild migraine rather than temporal lobe epilepsy, which was a core element in her pleading guilty by diminished responsibility. Although Doctor Chan Khim Yew had previously raised the fact that Contemplacion had not exhibited any unusual behaviour to her employers during the 3 years she worked for them, the defence asserted that they would only be able to observe her during evenings and weekends and therefore never had the chance to properly scrutinize her psychological condition. Defence lawyers also stated that Doctor Chan Khim Yew's observations were irrelevant to Contemplacion's mental state on the day of the murders as they took place after the fact.

The Appeal Court judges rejected all defence arguments, highlighting how Doctor Chan Khim Yew had observed Contemplacion's behaviour over 18 months while she was on remand and had ample time to diagnose any psychiatric issues. The court also gave credence to her faultless work history as evidence she was not suffering from any serious illness, as she was trusted to look after young children while living in the same house as her employers, who would have easily spotted Contemplacion having epileptic fits on a near monthly basis as she claimed. The original trial judge was also deemed to have correctly considered the calculated shrewdness of Contemplacion's actions inside the flat on the day of the murders as evidence of a lack of mental abnormality on her part, as well as her alert and quick thinking performance while under cross examination being proof she was in fact a cunning and intelligent person.

"I know I lost everything in my life in my heart. I think why I did this stupid thing, each and every day I ask myself."

— Excerpt of letter sent by Flor Contemplacion to her sister in law while she was on death row (17 February 1994)

=== Petition for clemency ===
On 21 January 1995, Contemplacion's lawyer submitted an official petition for clemency to Singaporean President Ong Teng Cheong, however acting on the advice of the Cabinet of Singapore, Ong turned down the petition in early February 1995.

=== Presidential intervention ===
In what was a landmark intervention, Philippine President Fidel V. Ramos wrote to President Ong twice to appeal on behalf of Contemplacion, first in early January 1995 requesting Contemplacion's death sentence to be commuted on humanitarian grounds and finally six days before her execution requesting a delay to evaluate purported new exculpatory evidence which had surfaced. Ong turned down the initial request as Singaporean authorities could see no special circumstances to justify clemency being granted. The last minute appeal for a stay of execution was also dismissed by Ong as the new "evidence" was examined by the police and found to be without merit.

== Incarceration on Death Row ==
Contemplacion was held in the death row section of Moon Crescent Prison while awaiting for her death sentence to be carried out, where she received weekly visits from a Good Shepherd nun named Sister Gerard Fernandez, who would administer the sacrament of communion. Contemplacion's family arrived in Singapore on the 1st March 1995 and had daily visits with her. Although they knew her sentence was about to be carried out and this would be the last time they would see her alive, they kept it secret from her on the advice of the Overseas Workers Welfare Administration. However, in mid-March, despite prison policy of censoring newspapers given to condemned inmates of articles regarding their execution by cutting out the entire article, Contemplacion was accidentally handed an uncensored paper that had a story about a Filipina inmate being executed in a few days time, which upset her greatly. The family were not allowed to have physical contact with Contemplacion during any of their visits, and could only communicate via an intercom phone while she sat on the other side of a bullet proof glass screen, with the final visit taking place on 16 March 1995 (the day before she was put to death).

== Allegations against Huang's father ==
In the days leading up to Contemplacion's execution, Filipina maid Emilia Frenilla, who had previously worked for Huang's uncle, submitted a sworn statement to the Singaporean Embassy in Manila, claiming:

- Nicholas Huang suffered from epilepsy
- Della Maga was murdered by Huang's father in a fit of rage when he discovered Huang had accidentally drowned after having a seizure and falling into a bucket of water
- Frenilla overheard Huang's father and uncle discussing how he framed Contemplacion for the deaths
- Huang's father and uncle spoke in a mixture of Malay and English, languages Frenilla was fluent in after previously working in Kota Kinabalu

However, after an investigation Singaporean authorities disregarded the new evidence, citing factual errors such as:

- Nicholas Huang's family doctor confirmed the boy had never been diagnosed with epilepsy
- Huang's father did not name Contemplacion in any statements he made to the police and she was only identified as a suspect after the police themselves had found her details in Maga's personal diary
- Huang's father and uncle do not speak Malay, and only converse with each other in Chinese (Hakka and/or Mandarin)

Also, the fact that after her arrest Contemplacion revealed to police the location of luxury items she had stolen from Maga provided strong circumstantial evidence that she was linked to the murders.

== Allegations of mistreatment while in custody ==
Shortly after midnight on the morning of the scheduled execution, Filipina citizen Virginia Custodio Parumog, who in 1992 had shared a prison cell with Contemplacion in Changi Prison while serving a custodial sentence for prostitution, returned to Singapore via commercial airline and then attempted to submit an affidavit to Singaporean authorities at Tanglin Police Division headquarters containing claims such as:

- Contemplacion had told her that when she arrived at the apartment in Bukit Panjang for a visit Nicolas was already dead, Maga then phoned Huang's father who rushed home and strangled her to death in anger, and when the police arrived they arrested Contemplacion on the orders of Huang's father
- Contemplacion did not give any statements to police after her arrest and strenuously denied all charges regarding the double murder she was accused of
- Contemplacion was twice forced to undergo electric shock therapy against her will while on remand
- Contemplacion was handcuffed to a bedframe in the Changi Prison hospital psychiatric ward for over a month
- Contemplacion was forced to take unknown tablets, possibly a tranquilizer, everytime she attended court during her trial
- Parumog herself was put into solitary confinement for attempting to smuggle a letter out of prison from Contemplacion to her husband

Shortly afterwards, the Ministry of Home Affairs released a communiqué denying all allegations, stating:

- when the police arrived at the crime scene Contemplacion was not there, Huang's father never mentioned Contemplacion's name during questioning nor made accusations against any other named person, and Contemplacion was in fact arrested in another part of Singapore later that day after the police themselves identified her as a person of interest
- Contemplacion made five statements to police, all of which were translated by an interpreter from the Philippine Embassy in Singapore and written copies of each were then signed by Contemplacion herself
- although her original trial lawyer challenged their admissibility on a legal technicality, Contemplacion never disavowed the contents of the statements she gave to the police and she did not retract her original confession throughout her trial, appeal, or petition for clemency from the President of Singapore
- Contemplacion was given two EEG tests, one of which was in fact requested by her own defence psychiatrist Doctor Terence Burke, at Tan Tock Seng hospital to help determine her mental health, however she was never administered electric shocks at any point during her incarceration
- although Contemplacion was handcuffed to a bedframe while under psychiatric observation, this was standard procedure for all prisoners facing charges related to capital punishment for security reasons and was not intended as a form of mistreatment
- while Contemplacion was prescribed medication for headaches and a sore throat while on remand, medical records proved she was not given any sort of medicine at all during her trial
- Changi Prison officers did not detect any attempt to smuggle letters from Contemplacion by Parumog or any other inmate
- Parumog was sent to solitary confinement cells on four different occasions, not for any events linked to Contemplacion but instead twice for fighting with other prisoners, once for giving herself a tattoo against prison regulations and once for a suicide attempt

== Execution ==
Sister Gerard Fernandez accompanied Contemplacion on her final walk to the gallows, where they both sang the hymn "Amazing Grace". Sister Gerard later described Contemplacion as being calm and at peace in her final moments. Just before dawn on the morning of 17 March 1995, Contemplacion was hanged at Changi Prison alongside three men convicted of drug trafficking. Her execution went ahead as scheduled despite a personal plea for clemency from Ramos to the Singaporean government.

== Aftermath ==
Many Filipinos believed that Contemplacion was innocent or at least insane, blaming the Singaporean government for a "lack of compassion", and the Philippine government for "not doing enough" to stop the execution. The Philippine Secretary of Foreign Affairs, Roberto Romulo, and Secretary of Labor and Employment, Nieves Confesor, both resigned as a result of the controversy.

The Philippine Embassy in Singapore in particular was heavily criticised, since it did little to help Contemplacion during the two years she was on remand, apart from delivering food and books to her in prison, and did not even have a consular representative as an observer in court throughout her trial. The former Embassy labour attaché Reynaldo Catapang later confirmed that they did not hire a private lawyer to represent Contemplacion and allowed the Singaporean authorities to appoint a public defender instead, nor did they keep any records of the legal proceedings or transcripts of the court case itself.

However, shortly after Contemplacion's execution the Philippines' former consul general in Singapore Elizabeth Buensuceso said that Contemplacion had disregarded the Embassy's warning not to make any admissions to the police until after she got proper legal representation in place. Buensuceso was also quoted by the Manila Chronicle that Contemplacion rejected their legal advice not to sign any confession after her arrest, saying "she was very furious then and kept shouting that she had committed the crime". It was also revealed that Contemplacion was allowed to have at least nine private consultations with Philippine Embassy officials without Singaporean authorities being present, yet she did not withdraw her original confession or change any aspect of her testimony at any of these meetings.

Although Ramos seemed initially resigned to the execution, he called Contemplacion a heroine. His wife, First Lady Amelita Ramos, went to receive Contemplacion's coffin at Ninoy Aquino International Airport in Manila on 19 March. Contemplacion's body was carried from the airport to San Pablo, and thousands of Filipinos lined the route. Fidel Ramos sent a wreath to Contemplacion's wake and offered financial assistance to Contemplacion's four children, who were dependent on their mother's income as a domestic worker, pledging one month of his salary to a scholarship fund. Prelates of the local Catholic Church also condemned the execution.

There were several protests held across the Philippines over Contemplacion's execution, some of which were organized by politicians and labor organizations. Thousands of Singapore flags were burned in the protests. In one of the protests, the mayor of Davao City, Rodrigo Duterte, burned a flag of Singapore while leading 1,000 employees of Davao City in protest.

Several threats against Singaporeans and Singapore properties in the Philippines were reported. Singaporean tourists either shortened or canceled their holiday trips in the Philippines in view of their safety. Skilled Singaporean workers working in the Philippines either left the country or were recalled back to Singapore by their companies.

The Alex Boncayao Brigade, a Filipino assassination unit of the Philippine New People's Army, had threatened to kill Filipino officials and diplomats if they failed to stop Contemplacion's execution.

Following the execution, Prime Minister Goh Chok Tong's planned trip to Manila, which was at the invitation of Ramos, was postponed. Ramos recalled the Filipino ambassador to Singapore, and many bilateral exchanges between the countries were cancelled.

The 1995 edition of Anoa-Singa military exercise between the Filipino and Singaporean militaries which was ongoing at that time, abruptly ended when news of Contemplacion's execution occurred, forcing the Singaporean troops to leave the country.

A Presidential Fact Finding Commission was set up in the Philippines to investigate Contemplacion's case and the findings were submitted to Ramos on 6 April 1995. In a statement by Ramos, a protective programme was approved to oversee the welfare of overseas Filipinos with the deployment of government staff, lawyers and doctors to various countries. The Singapore government responded that it had rejected the findings but agreed to Ramos's request to examine Maga's remains by two Singaporean pathologists and three foreign consultants.

The first autopsy done by Singaporean pathologists concluded that Maga died of asphyxia due to strangulation which was disputed by the Philippines' National Bureau of Investigation experts. A final autopsy was conducted in July by an independent panel, whose results would be final, and both governments required to accept the findings. If the findings determined that Maga did not die of asphyxia, the Singapore government will reopen Contemplacion's case and re-investigate the deaths of Maga and Huang. The independent panel ultimately did determine that Maga's cause of death was asphyxia, which the Philippines government accepted. Philippines and Singapore began to reconcile their bilateral relations.

== 1995 Presidential Fact Finding Commission ==
In April 1995, a Presidential Fact Finding Commission was set up by Ramos to investigate the facts surrounding the death of Della Maga and Contemplacion's conviction for the murder. The finished report recommended that the case be reopened, after gathering new testimony, in addition to earlier claims made by Parumog and Frenilla, such as:

- claims by Lucena Songalia Sarceno, who was serving a 16-month custodial sentence for extortion in Changi Women's Prison at the same time as Contemplacion was incarcerated there, that she overheard Philippine consul general Elizabeth Buensuceso advise Contemplacion in July 1992 to plead guilty and that she would only be sentenced to five years in prison if she did so
- Contemplacion had denied any involvement in the murders to Sarceno and claimed she had been forced to lie in a coffin filled with dry ice
- Sarceno asserted she personally witnessed Contemplacion being tortured by prison guards via electrocution involving a basin of water
- Sarceno also claimed Contemplacion appeared visibly drugged before going to court during her trial, often taking a few days to return to normal cognitive functioning, and Sarceno observed prison officers taking Contemplacion to the prison infirmary the day preceding each court appearance
- Contemplacion's niece Josie De Sagun claimed to have received a letter where Contemplacion made allegations of being raped and forced fed tranquilizers against her will
- Alicia Vinzon Mabulay claimed to have spoken to Contemplacion while she was briefly detained in Changi Prison for immigration offences in 1993, and was informed by Contemplacion that she was tortured and drugged by the guards
- the original trial judge should have considered a defence of diminished responsibility before finding Contemplacion guilty of murder and sentencing her to death

The Singaporean government described the findings as "totally absurd" and based on uncorroborated hearsay testimonies of individuals who did not witness the crime itself, and later released its own point by point rebuttal of the findings, such as:

- Contemplacion had confessed to the murders over a year before meeting Buensuceso and Sarceno was not present in the part of the prison where the interview took place on the day in question
- no coffins are kept in any prisons in Singapore and Contemplacion never complained of mistreatment to Philippine embassy officials who had visited her dozens of times or to a nun (Sister Gerard Fernandez) who visited her weekly on death row.
- although Contemplacion underwent EEG tests, they took place in a hospital 10 miles away where Sarceno wasn't present
- while it was true Contemplacion received antibiotics and painkillers while on remand she was not issued any medication at all during her trial
- Contemplacion had never complained of being raped to visiting Philippine Embassy officials, all 70 letters sent by Contemplacion from prison were copied by authorities as a matter of policy and none of those contained any allegations of rape, and Contemplacion was detained in prisons with all female staff the entire time she was incarcerated
- Contemplacion was already segregated in the death row section of Moon Crescent Prison at the time Mabulay was imprisoned in the general population of Changi Women's Prison, therefore it was impossible for them to have spoken to each other
- Contemplacion was examined before her trial by independent psychiatrist Doctor Fong Yeng Hoi, who found she was not suffering from any mental illness that would impair her perception of events or people via hallucinations and cause her to act irrationally, which therefore procedurally barred Contemplacion's lawyer from submitting a defence based on pleading not guilty by reason of insanity

== Fate of Contemplacion's family ==
On 20 October 2005, three of Contemplacion's sons, Sandrex and twins Jun-Jun and Joel, were arrested for drug trafficking after a buy-bust sting operation by San Pablo police, where an undercover officer bought ₱3,000 worth of methamphetamine from the brothers. On 9 March 2011, all three were sentenced to life in prison and also fined ₱500,000 each for violation of the Comprehensive Dangerous Drugs Act of 2002. In August 2008, Contemplacion's widower Efren and his new partner were arrested in a similar anti-drug operation by the same police force.

On 6 April 2013, Contemplacion's other son, Romulo, was arrested in San Pablo in connection with the murder of councilman Roland Acbang in Barangay San Crispin, and the attempted murder of Rardine Mercado in Barangay Francisco. A police raid on the Barangay San Diego house that Romulo and three other men were hiding in recovered firearms and hand grenades believed to be linked to the attacks. All four suspects were later charged with illegal possession of firearms and explosives, with murder charges also expected to be filed against them after police had finished their forensic evidence investigations.

As of 2023, Contemplacion's only daughter Russel was living in Manila, where she was employed by the Engineering Department of the Congress of the Philippines.

== In popular culture ==
The Flor Contemplacion Story, directed by Joel Lamangan and starring Nora Aunor in the role of Contemplacion, was released by Viva Entertainment and also won Best Picture in the Cairo Film Festival in 1995.

Contemplacion's story was also featured in another film by Regal Films and Golden Lions Films Productions, Victim No. 1: Delia Maga (Jesus, Pray for Us! : A Massacre In Singapore), directed by Carlo J. Caparas and starring Gina Alajar in the role of Della Maga. In the film, Della Maga's name was changed to Delia Maga.

In 1995, another documentary film on the incident was released, titled Bagong Bayani (also known as "A New Hero" or "Unsung Heroine"), and directed by Tikoy Aguiluz. It starred Helen Gamboa as Contemplacion and Chanda Romero as Maga.

Contemplacion's case was featured in an episode of GMA Network's crime documentary program, Case Unclosed.

The fate of Contemplacion's family after her execution was the subject of an episode of GMA Network's drama anthology series, Magpakailanman, starring Alessandra de Rossi as Flor's daughter Russel, who suffered from a string of unfortunate events after her mother's death including her widower's drug addiction, the imprisonment of her father and siblings from drugs, and hardships on balancing work and motherhood. The episode was titled “Life After the Death of Flor Contemplacion” and originally aired on 13 April 2013.

In Singapore, the murders were one of the cases solved by Professor Chao Tzee Cheng, the senior forensic pathologist. The events were later re-enacted by the Singaporean crime show Whispers of the Dead in 2014. Contemplacion, Huang and Maga had their names changed for dramatic purposes and to protect their identities, although the overall turn of events and trial proceedings remained reminiscent of the real life events.

== See also ==
- Capital punishment in Singapore
- Filipinos in Singapore
- Philippines–Singapore relations
- Mary Jane Veloso
- Sarah Balabagan, a Filipino maid convicted of murder in United Arab Emirates
