= Philippines–Singapore relations =

- Philippines: Singapore

Diplomatic mission
- Philippines Embassy, Singapore: Singapore Embassy, Manila

Envoy
- Ambassador Medardo G. Macaraig: Ambassador Constance See

Philippines–Singapore relations are bilateral relations between the Philippines and Singapore. The Philippines has an embassy in Singapore. Singapore likewise, has an embassy in Manila. Full diplomatic relations commenced on 16 May 1969, when the Philippine consulate-general in Singapore was raised to embassy level.

Both countries are English-speaking members of APEC, and founding members of ASEAN.

== Country comparison ==
Official Name	Republic of the Philippines	Republic of Singapore
Coat of Arms		
Flag		
Population	100,981,437	5,607,300
Area	343,448 km^{2} (132,606 mi^{2})	719.1 km^{2} (277.6 mi^{2})
Population Density	125/km^{2} (320/sq mi)	20,194.1/km^{2} (52,302/sq mi)
Time zones	1	1
Capital	Manila	Singapore (City-state)
Largest City	Quezon City – 2,936,116	Bedok – 289,750
Established	12 June 1898 (Independence Declared); 4 July 1946 (Independence Granted)	3 June 1959 (Autonomy Granted); 7 August 1965 (Independence Proclaimed)
Predecessor States	American Colonial Period (1898–1935); United States Military Government (1898–1902); Philippine Republic (1899–1901); United States Insular Government (1901–1935) Self–Government Period (1935–1946); Commonwealth of the Philippines (1935–1946); Japanese-sponsored Philippine Republic (1943–1945) Post–Colonial Period (1946–present); Republic of the Philippines: Post-War Period (1946–1965); Marcos Administration (1965–1986); Post–Marcos Period (1986–present)	British Colonial Period (1819–1946); Trade Post of Singapore (1819–1826); Settlement of Singapore (1826–1946); Japanese-occupied Syonanto (1942–1945); British Military Administration (1945–1946) Self–Government Period (1946–1965); Colony of Singapore (1946–1963); State of Singapore (1963–1965) Post–Colonial Period (1965–present); Republic of Singapore: LKY Administration (1965–1990); Post–LKW Period (1990–present)
Government	Unitary multi-party presidential constitutional republic	Unitary dominant-party parliamentary constitutional republic
First Leader	Emilio Aguinaldo (official); Manuel L. Quezon (de jure)	Yusof Ishak (President); Lee Kuan Yew (Prime Minister)
Current Leader(s)	President: Bongbong Marcos	President: Tharman Shanmugaratnam
Current Leader(s)	Vice President: Sara Duterte	Prime Minister: Lawrence Wong
Legislature	Congress; President of the Senate Sherwin Gatchalian Senate; President: Vicente Sotto III; House of Representatives; Speaker: Alan Peter Cayetano	Parliament; Speaker: Seah Kian Peng
Judiciary	Supreme Court; Chief Justice: Diosdado Peralta	Supreme Court; Chief Justice: Sundaresh Menon
Military	Armed Forces of the Philippines (AFP): Philippine Army; Philippine Air Force; Philippine Navy	Singapore Armed Forces (SAF): Singapore Army; Republic of Singapore Air Force; Republic of Singapore Navy
Law Enforcement Agencies	Philippine National Police (PNP)	Singapore Police Force (SPF)
Official language(s)	Filipino, English	English, Malay, Mandarin, Tamil
GDP (nominal)	US$811.726 billion (7,846 per capita)	US$311.282 billion($55,252 per capita)

== Relations ==
President Benigno Aquino III's visit to Lucky Plaza, Orchard Road in November 2014.

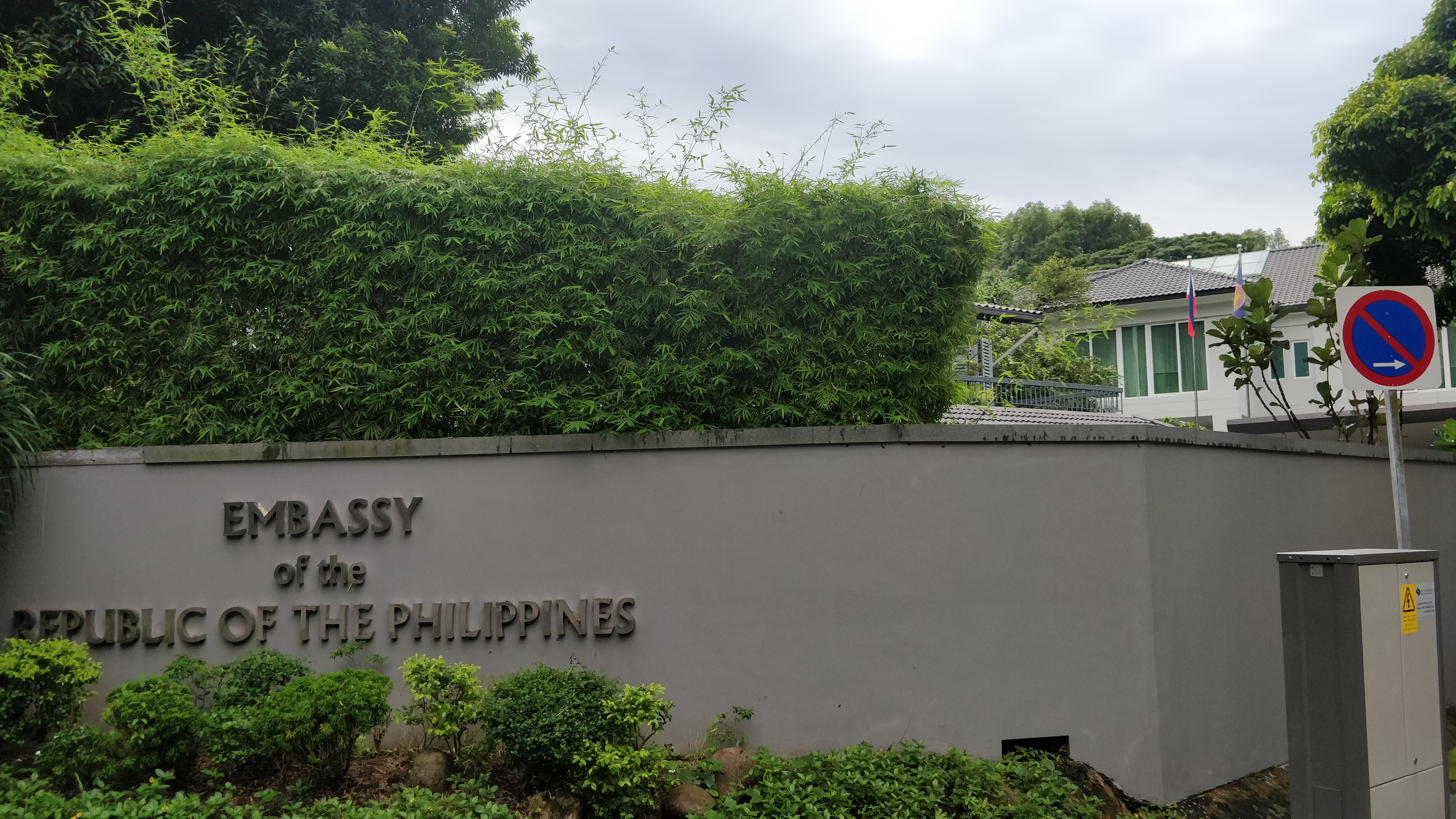
The embassy of the Philippines in Singapore.

The Philippine-Singapore Business Council is also present as an organization dedicated to the cooperation of the business communities of the two countries. The council was launched on 13 October 1994 in Singapore. Both Fidel V. Ramos, the President of the Philippines, and Goh Chok Tong, the Prime Minister of Singapore attended the launch.

Aside from economic relationships, the two countries also agree in improving tourism and security relationships. In August 1986, Philippine President Corazon Aquino preferred to travel to Jakarta and Singapore, breaking the tradition that the first overseas visit of the President should always be Washington. Singapore Prime Minister Lee Kuan Yew, together with Indonesian President Suharto, suggested to Aquino to avoid reconciliation with the communist insurgents in her country and extend the rights of the bases of the United States in the Philippines. During a state visit by Philippine President Gloria Macapagal-Arroyo in Singapore in 2007, she discussed the liberalization of air travel between the two countries to improve tourism. She also discussed with Singapore Prime Minister Lee Hsien Loong regarding a status of forces agreement (SOFA) to combat terrorism and transnational crimes.

In 1995, a planned state visit by the Singaporean Prime Minister was postponed "until a more propitious time" after the execution of Flor Contemplacion. The case caused the most profound rift between the two ASEAN countries for more than 25 years. Economic relationships between the two countries were also strained. Singaporean investments in the Philippines dropped from US$65 million from 1994 to US$3.7 million by 1995. Despite this controversy, full diplomatic relationships between the two countries were restored in January of the following year. In December 1998, the two countries signed a Philippine-Singapore Action to improve bilateral trade at the ASEAN summit in Hanoi.

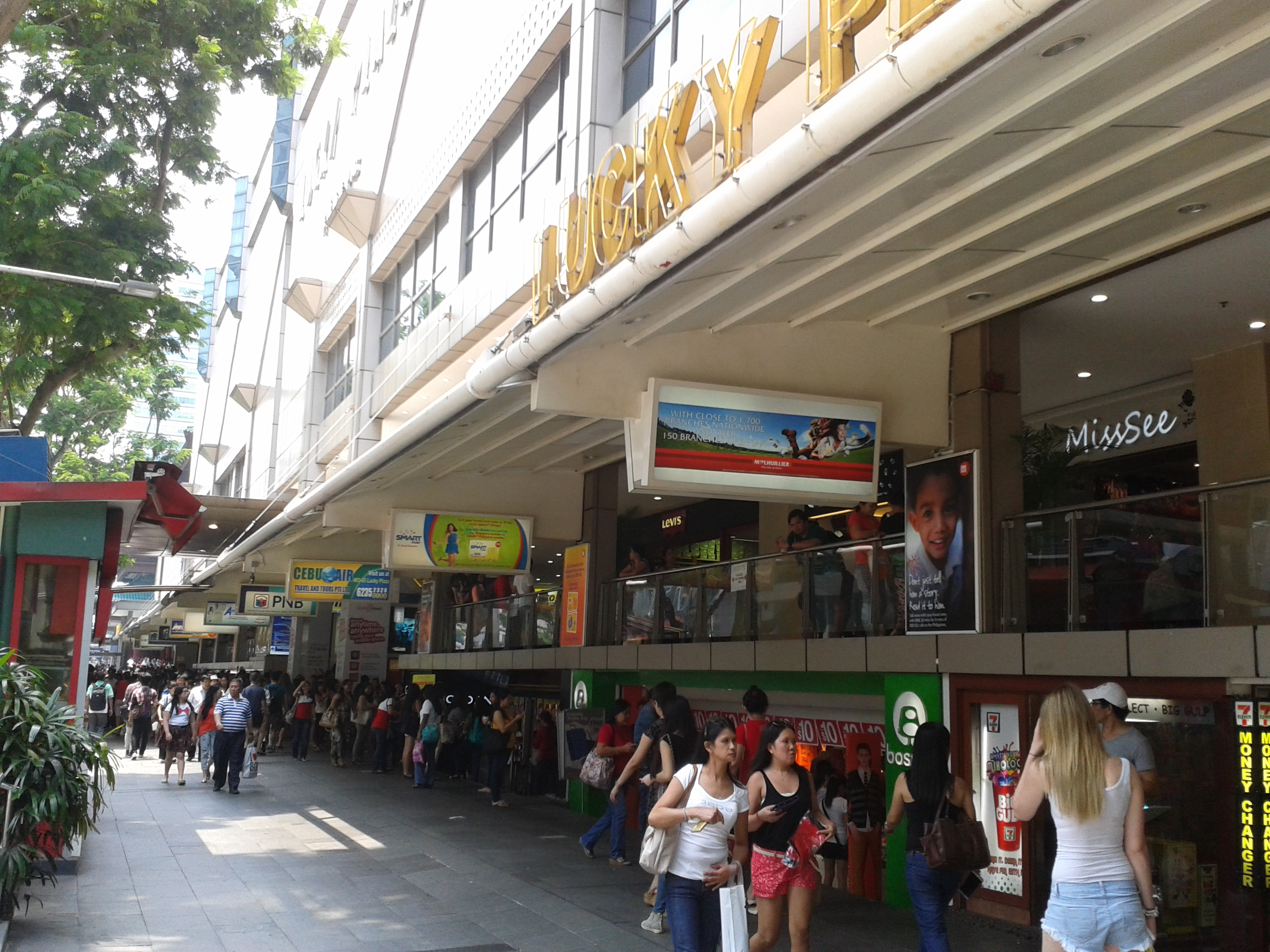
The Lucky Plaza mall in Orchard Road host products and services that are catered for Filipino foreign workers in Singapore.

In 2013, Singapore is the 4th top trading partner of the Philippines, with $8.22 billion (₱454.97B, S$10.94B) in bilateral trade. It was also the sixth top source of visitors, with more than 175,000 in arrivals. Singapore is also host to a Filipino community of about 180,000.

=== Military ===
In January 2017, Secretary Delfin Lorenzana announced that he is seeking a revival of Filipino-Singaporean military exercises known as Anoa-Singa, which started in 1993. It was stopped in 1996 due to a lack of a military agreement that would allow Singaporean forces to conduct exercises since the Filipino Constitution does not allow foreign troops to be deployed in the Philippines.

In July 2024, Singapore has expressed no interest in further pursuing talks to revive bilateral exercises between the two countries due to the US and Australia having lots of space for the SAF to use, while agreeing to cooperate with the Philippines in areas including military education, humanitarian relief, disaster response and anti-terrorism. In October 2025, the Philippines is seeking to further expand defense ties with Singapore.

== Agreements ==
In 2007, the two countries signed a Memorandum of Understanding in order to promote cooperation in media policy and information exchange. In 2008, the Philippine government voluntarily stopped the export of 50,000 tonnes of pork to Singapore due to the cases of Ebola Reston in some farms in Luzon. This export was supposed to be the Philippines' first of pork.
