= Embassy of the Philippines, Singapore =

Diplomatic mission of the Philippines in Singapore

Embassy of the Philippines, Singapore Pasuguan ng Pilipinas sa Singapura

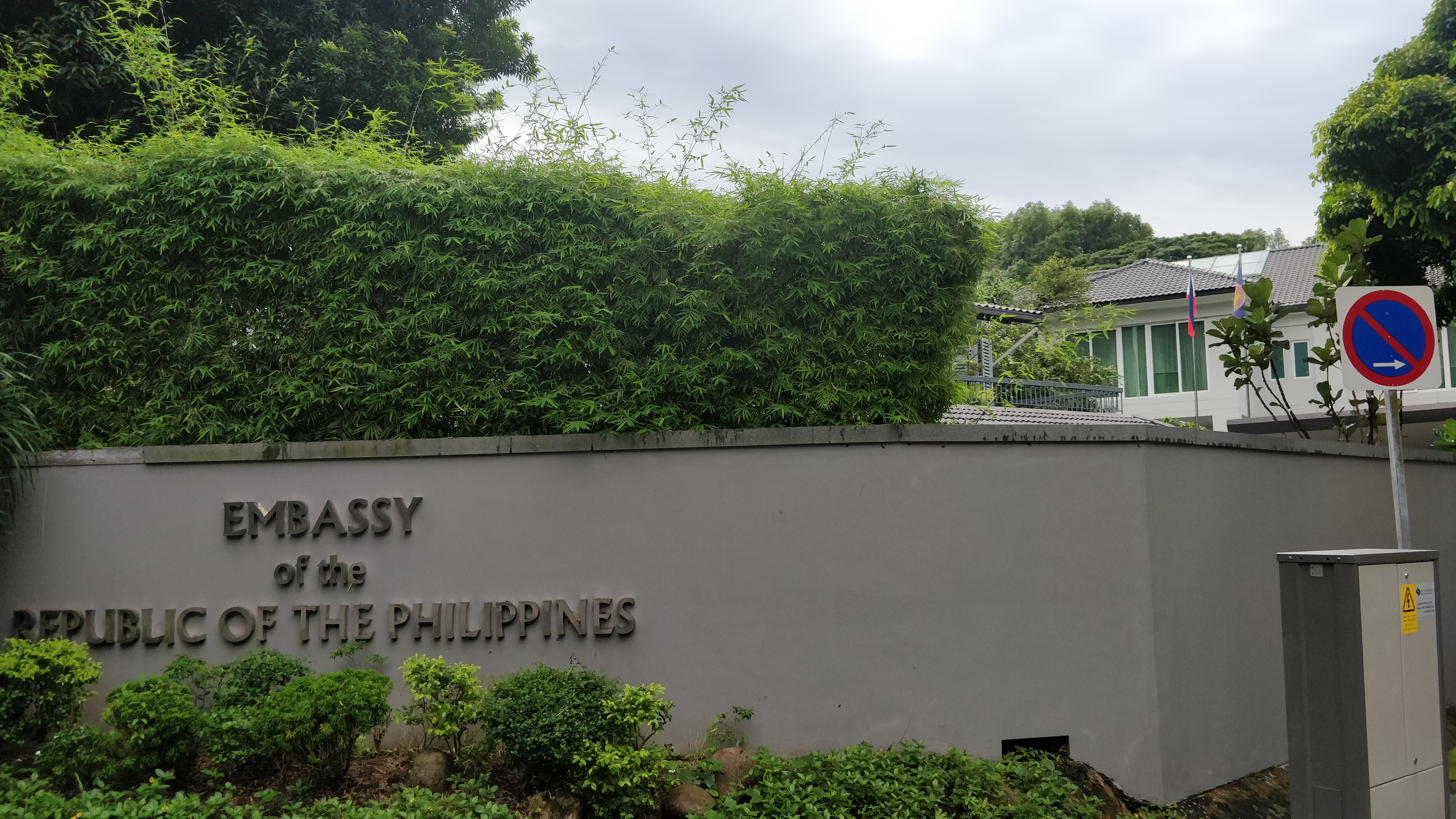
- Philippine Chancery, Singapore
- Location: Tanglin, Singapore
- Address: 20 Nassim Road; Singapore 258395
- Coordinates: 01°18′32.6358″N 103°49′14.1895″E
- Ambassador: Medardo G. Macaraig
- Website: www.philippine-embassy.org.sg

The Embassy of the Philippines in Singapore is the diplomatic mission of the Philippines in Singapore. It is one of the 17 embassies and high commissions that operate within their diplomatic compound. The chancery is located at 20 Nassim Road in Tanglin, while the official residence is at 17 Victoria Park Road in Bukit Timah Planning Area.

== History ==
A Philippine diplomatic presence was established in Singapore in 1966, despite the absence of formal diplomatic relations. Full diplomatic relations between the two countries was established in 1969.

The first Philippine diplomatic mission in Singapore was a consulate-general that opened in 1967 along Orchard Road, near the premises of the Royal Thai Embassy. In 1986, the Embassy relocated to a newly built building on Nassim Road, where it remains today.

The Philippine Embassy is temporarily located at Level 16,#12A, 13-14 Devonshire Wing, 111 Somerset Building 111 Somerset Road, Singapore 238164

== Staff ==
The Philippine Embassy in Singapore is headed by Ambassador Medardo G. Macaraig. As of 2014, the mission had a total of 60 staff members representing five different government departments, consisting of six consuls and vice-consuls, 26 expatriate staff hired by the Department of Foreign Affairs, 14 Singapore-based locally hired employees, and 18 representatives of different government agencies.

Among the agencies with a presence at the mission include the Department of Labor and Employment, the Overseas Workers Welfare Administration, the Armed Forces of the Philippines and the Department of National Defense, the Social Security System, and the Home Development Mutual Fund (Pag-IBIG Fund). While the trade mission of the Department of Trade and Industry in Singapore is part of the Embassy, it maintains separate offices along Orchard Road.

== See also ==
- Embassy of Singapore, Manila
- List of diplomatic missions of the Philippines
- Philippines-Singapore relations
