= Judicial officers of the Republic of Singapore =

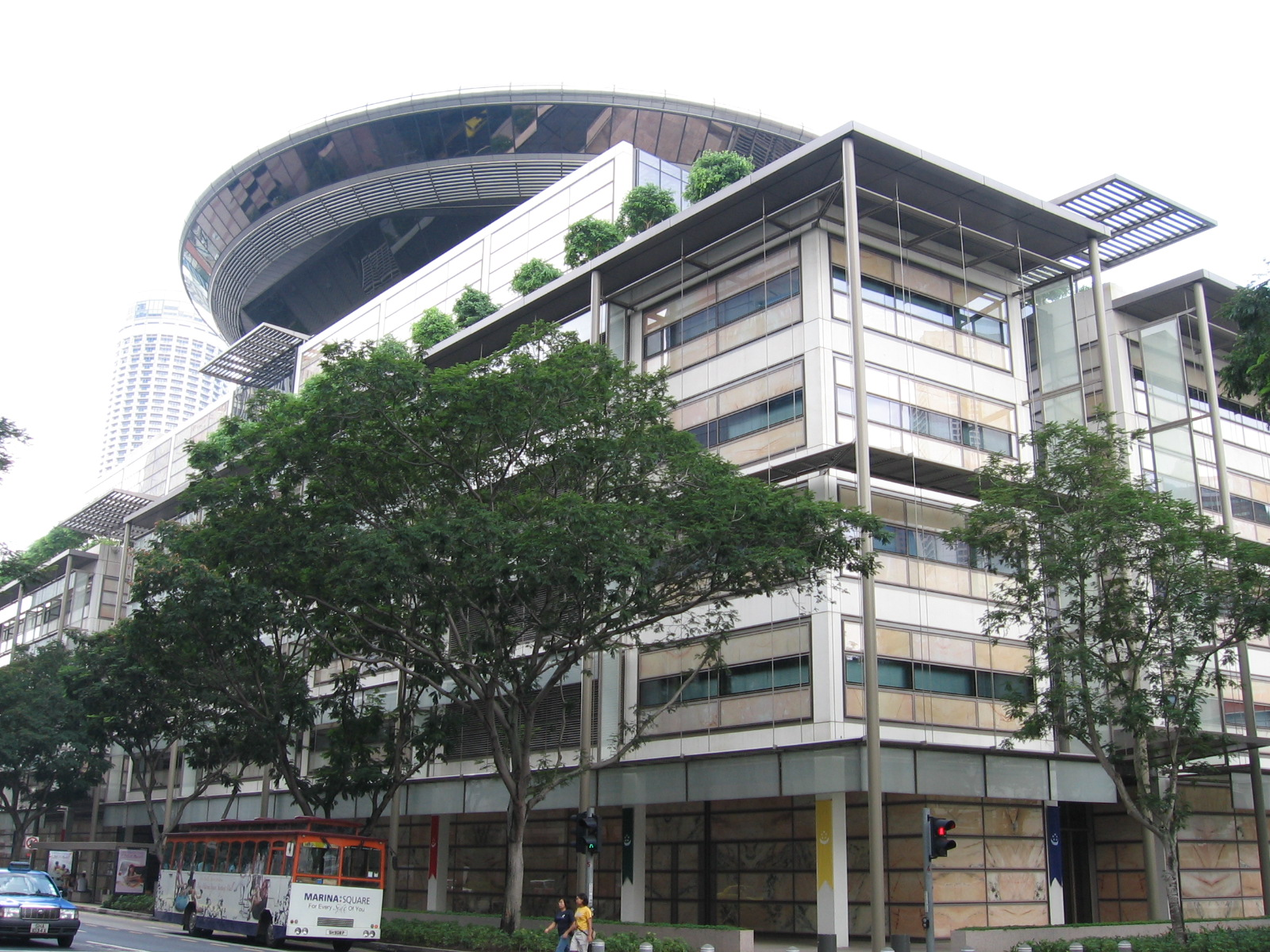
The Supreme Court Building, designed by Foster and Partners, which commenced operations on 20 June 2005 – photographed in August 2006

The judicial officers of the Republic of Singapore serve in the Supreme Court, the Family Justice Courts, and the State Courts (known up to 6 March 2014 as the Subordinate Courts). They hear and determine disputes between litigants in civil cases and, in criminal matters, to determine the liability of accused persons and their sentences if they are convicted.

In the Supreme Court of Singapore, the current senior judicial officers comprise the Chief Justice, the Justices of the Court of Appeal, the Judges of the Appellate Division, the Judges of the High Court, Senior Judges, Judicial Commissioners and International Judges. The other judicial officers include the Registrar of the Supreme Court, the Deputy Registrar, Senior Assistant Registrars and Assistant Registrars.

The State Courts are headed by the Presiding Judge of the State Courts, and include Principal District Judges, a Senior District Judge, Deputy Principal District Judges, District Judges and Magistrates. The other judicial officers are the Registrar of the State Courts, the Senior Deputy Registrar, and the Deputy Registrars.

The Family Justice Courts are headed by the Presiding Judge of the Family Justice Courts, assisted by the Deputy Presiding Judge, Judges of the High Court (Family Division), and judicial officers such as District Judges and Magistrates. The District Judges and Magistrates may concurrently be appointed as Assistant Registrars.

== Judicial officers of the Supreme Court ==
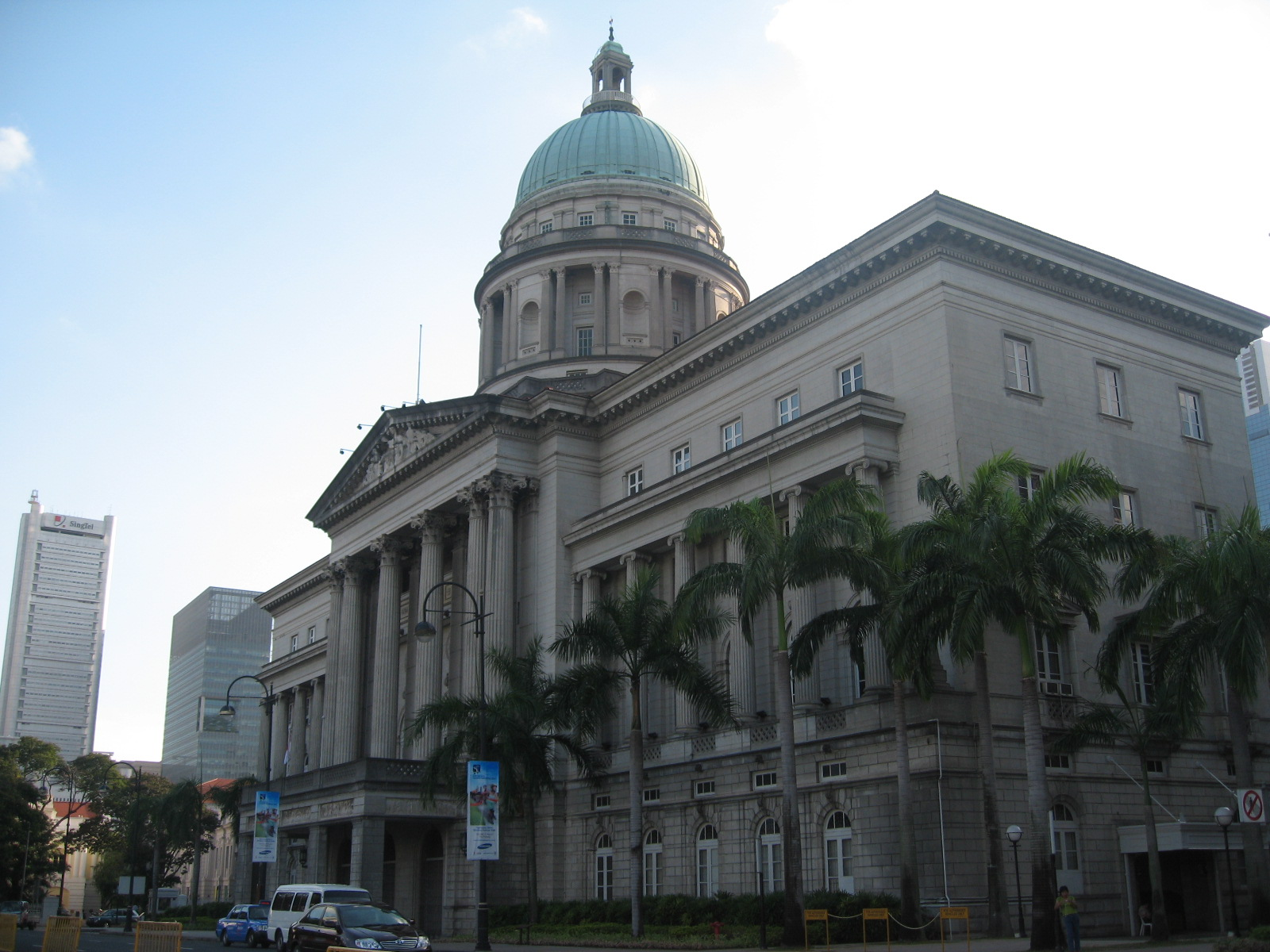
The former Supreme Court building, officially opened in 1939, housed the Court of Appeal and some of the courtrooms of the High Court until 2005 – photographed in August 2006

=== Structure ===
The superior courts of Singapore are collectively known as the Supreme Court of Singapore. The Supreme Court consists of the Court of Appeal and the High Court, which further consists of the Appellate Division and the General Division. The Singapore International Commercial Court is a division of the General Division.

The Court of Appeal is Singapore's highest court. It is headed by the President of the Court of Appeal, who is the Chief Justice, and the other members of the Court are the Justices of the Court of Appeal. The Chief Justice may appoint one or more of the Justices of the Court of Appeal as Vice-Presidents of the Court of Appeal.

The other senior judicial officers of the Supreme Court are Justices of the Court of Appeal, Judges of the Appellate Division, Judges of the High Court, Senior Judges, International Judges and Judicial Commissioners. The Chief Justice may request a Judge (but not a Judicial Commissioner) of the High Court to sit as a judge of the Court of Appeal, in which case the judge shall have all the jurisdiction, powers and privileges of a judge of the Court of Appeal.

The Supreme Court Judges rank in the following order:

1. The Chief Justice.
2. The Vice-Presidents of the Court of Appeal according to the order of their appointments.
3. The Justices of the Court of Appeal (other than the Vice‑Presidents of the Court of Appeal) according to the order of their appointments.
4. The President of the Appellate Division (if the Chief Justice is not the President of the Appellate Division).
5. The Judges of the Appellate Division (other than the President of the Appellate Division) according to the order of their appointments.
6. The Judges of the High Court according to the order of their appointments.

The other judicial officers are the Registrar, the Deputy Registrar, Senior Assistant Registrars, and Assistant Registrars.

Current office holders

As of May 2026, the principal judicial officeholders of the Supreme Court are as follows:

Position	Justice
Chief Justice and President of the Court of Appeal	Sundaresh Menon
Justice of the Court of Appeal	Tay Yong Kwang
Justice of the Court of Appeal	Steven Chong Horng Siong
Justice of the Court of Appeal	Ang Cheng Hock
Justice of the Court of Appeal	Hri Kumar Nair

=== Qualifications ===
A person is qualified for appointment as a Judge or Judicial Commissioner of the Supreme Court by being a qualified person within the meaning of section 2 of the Legal Profession Act for at least 10 years, or a member of the Singapore Legal Service, or both.

The Legal Profession Act defines a "qualified person" as any person who —

(a) before 1 May 1993 —

(i) has passed the final examination for the degree of Bachelor of Laws in the University of Malaya in Singapore, the University of Singapore or the National University of Singapore;
(ii) was and still is a barrister-at-law of England or of Northern Ireland or a member of the Faculty of Advocates in Scotland;
(iii) was and still is a solicitor in England or Northern Ireland or a writer to the Signet, law agent or solicitor in Scotland; or
(iv) was and still is in possession of such other degree or qualification as may have been declared by the Minister for Law under section 7 of the Act in force immediately before 1 January 1994 and has obtained a certificate from the Board of Legal Education under that section;

(b) on or after 1 May 1993 possesses such qualifications and satisfies such requirements as the Minister may prescribe under section 2(2) of the Act; or
(c) is approved by the Board as a qualified person under section 7.

=== Appointment ===
The Chief Justice, Justices of the Court of Appeal, the Judges of the Appellate Division and the Judges of the High Court are appointed by the President if he, acting in his discretion, concurs with the advice of the Prime Minister. The Prime Minister must consult the Chief Justice before tendering his advice to the President as to the appointment of a judge.

In order to facilitate the disposal of business in the Supreme Court, the President may if he concurs with the advice of the Prime Minister, appoint a person qualified for appointment as a Judge of the Supreme Court to be a Judicial Commissioner of the Supreme Court for such period or periods as the President thinks fit. A Judicial Commissioner so appointed may, in respect of such class or classes of cases as the Chief Justice may specify, exercise the powers and perform the functions of a Judge of the High Court. Anything done by a Judicial Commissioner when acting in accordance with the terms of the appointment shall have the same validity and effect as if done by a Judge of that Court and, in respect thereof, shall have the same powers and enjoy the same immunities as being a Judge of that Court. A person may be appointed to be a Judicial Commissioner to hear and determine a specified case only.

A person qualified for appointment as a Judge of the Supreme Court or a person who has ceased to hold the office of a Judge of the Supreme Court (for instance, due to retirement), may be appointed by the Chief Justice, or may sit as a Judge of the High Court or as a Justice of the Court of Appeal, if designated for the purpose (as occasion requires), and such person shall hold office for such period or periods as the President shall direct, if the President concurs with the advice of the Prime Minister.

The Chief Justice and every person appointed or designated to sit as a Justice of the Court of Appeal, a Judge of the Appellate Division, a Judge of the High Court, a Judicial Commissioner, a Senior Judge or an International Judge must take, in the presence of the President, the following Oath of Office:

I, [name], having been appointed to the office of [Chief Justice, Judge of Appeal, Judge or Judicial Commissioner], do solemnly swear [or affirm] that I will faithfully discharge my judicial duties, and I will do right to all manner of people after the laws and usages of the Republic of Singapore without fear or favour, affection or ill-will to the best of my ability, and will preserve, protect and defend the Constitution of the Republic of Singapore.

=== Tenure of office ===
A judge of the Supreme Court holds office until one of the following takes place:

- The judge dies in office.
- The judge attains the age of 65 years or such later time not being later than six months after they attain that age, as the President may approve. The validity of anything done by a Judge shall not be questioned on the ground that they had attained the age at which they were required to retire.
- The judge resigns their office by writing under their hand addressed to the President.
- The judge if removed from office by the President on the recommendation of a tribunal appointed by the President that a judge ought to be removed on the ground of misbehaviour or of inability, from infirmity of body or mind or any other cause, to properly discharge the functions of their office. The procedure for the removal of a Judge is as follows:
1. The Prime Minister, or the Chief Justice after consulting with the Prime Minister, may represent to the President that a Judge ought to be removed on one or more of the above grounds.
2. The President shall appoint a tribunal and refer the representation of the Prime Minister or Chief Justice to it for its recommendation on the matter. The tribunal shall consist of not less than five persons who hold or have held office as a Judge of the Supreme Court or, if it appears to the President expedient to make such an appointment, persons who hold or have held equivalent office in any part of the Commonwealth. The tribunal is presided over by the member first in the following order: the Chief Justice according to their precedence among themselves and other members according to the order of their appointment to an office qualifying them for membership (the older coming before the younger of two members with appointments of the same date).
3. Pending any reference and report, the President may, if they, acting in their discretion, concur with the recommendation of the Prime Minister and, in the case of any other Judge, after consulting with the Chief Justice, suspend a Judge of the Supreme Court from the exercise of their functions.

=== Remuneration ===
Parliament is required by the Constitution to provide for the remuneration of the judges of the Supreme Court, and it has done so by enacting the Judges' Remuneration Act and issuing the Judges' Remuneration (Annual Pensionable Salary) Order pursuant to the Act. Upon retirement or death in office, a judge may be granted a gratuity granted by the President although there is no entitlement under the Act to such gratuity.

=== Judicial independence ===
To secure the independence of the judiciary, the Singapore Constitution makes the following provision:

- The office of a Judge of the Supreme Court shall not be abolished during their continuance in office.
- A Judge of the Supreme Court holds office until they attain the age of 65 years or such later time not being later than six months after they attain that age, as the President may approve, and may not be removed from office unless the procedure set out in the "Tenure of office" subsection above is followed.
- The remuneration and other terms of office (including pension rights) of a Judge of the Supreme Court shall not be altered to their disadvantage after their appointment.
- The conduct of a Judge of the Supreme Court or a person designated to sit as such a Judge or a Judicial Commissioner shall not be discussed in Parliament except on a substantive motion of which notice has been given by not less than one-quarter of the total number of the Members of Parliament.

In addition, the Attorney-General may bring committal proceedings against a person for contempt of court by doing an act or publishing a piece of writing calculated to bring the court or a judge into contempt or to lower their authority (known as "scandalising" the court or the judge); or calculated to obstruct or interfere with the due course of justice.

At common law, no judge of a superior court or inferior court is liable in damages if acting within jurisdiction, even if they do so maliciously. Further, no judge of a superior court is liable for an act done outside jurisdiction, provided that this was done by the judge in the honest belief that the act was within jurisdiction. Liability only attaches in such cases if the judge knowingly acts outside jurisdiction.

=== Forms of address ===
The Chief Justice, the Judges and Judicial Commissioners are, when sitting in open court or in chambers, addressed as "Your Honour", and on social occasions or other extrajudicial occasions as "Chief Justice" or "Judge", as the case may be. In all cause lists, orders of Court, correspondence and other documents, the Chief Justice, the Justices of the Court of Appeal, the Judges of the Appellate Division, the Judges of the High Court, the Senior Judges, the International Judges and the Judicial Commissioners must, in all cause lists, orders of court, correspondence and other documents, be described in the following manner without any accompanying gender prefix.

Office	Form of Address	Abbreviated Form of Address
Chief Justice	"Chief Justice [name]"	"[name] CJ"
Justice of the Court of Appeal	"Justice [name]"	"[name] JCA"
Judge of the Appellate Division	"Justice [name]"	"[name] JAD"
Judge of the High Court	"Justice [name]"	"[name] J"
Senior Judge	"Justice [name]"	"[name] SJ"
International Judge	"Justice [name]"	"[name] IJ"
Judicial Commissioner	"Judicial Commissioner [name]"	"[name] JC"

=== List of judges of the Supreme Court ===
The table below lists the judges that were in office on or after 9 August 1965, the date when Singapore left Malaysia and became an independent republic. Judges currently in office are highlighted.

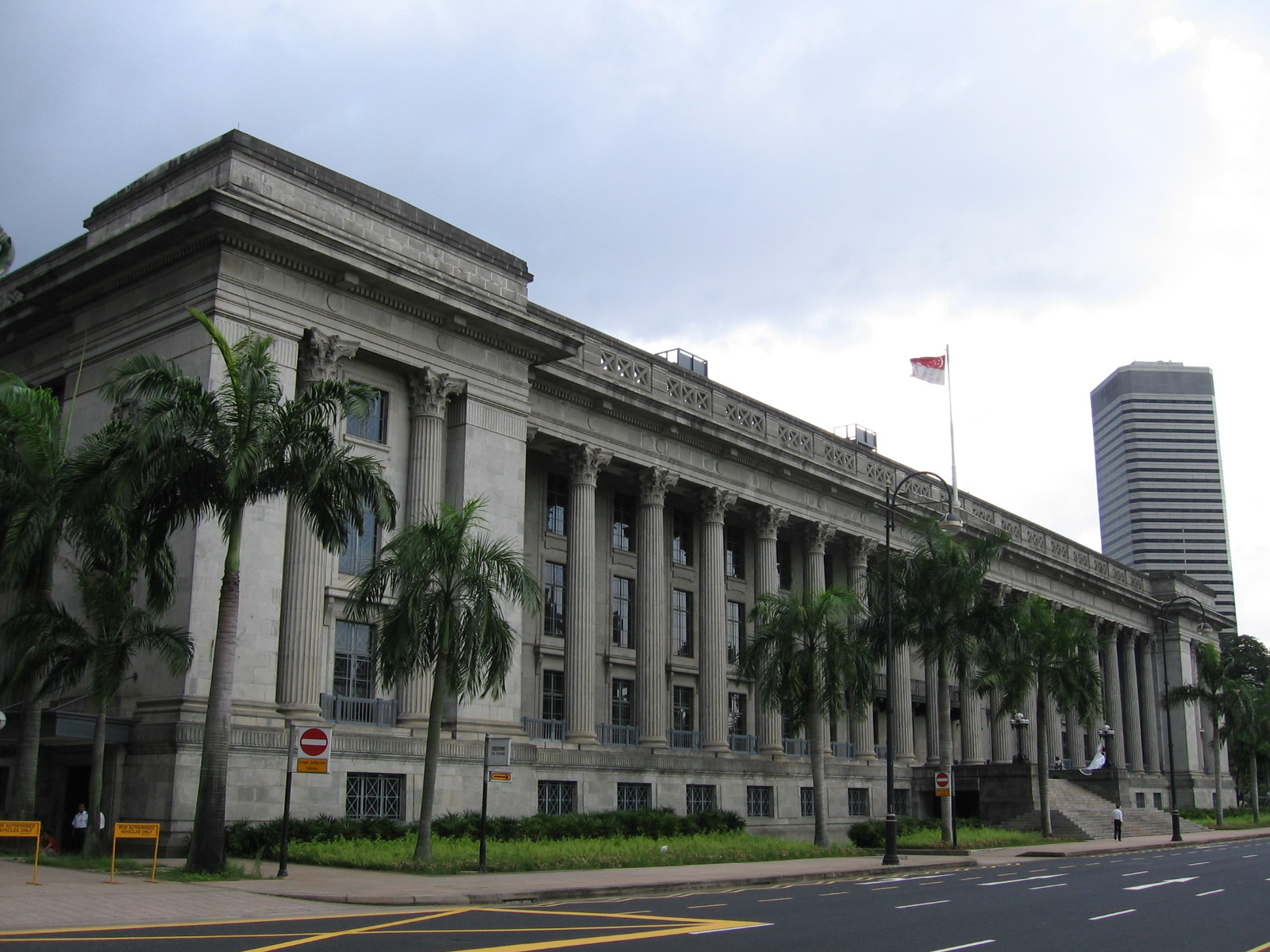
On St. Andrew's Road facing the Padang is City Hall, which was built between 1926 and 1929 and housed 12 courtrooms of the High Court from 1988 to 2005 – photographed in January 2006

Singapore's full independence was effected by three statutes, one enacted by Malaysia and two by Singapore. The Constitution and Malaysia (Singapore Amendment) Act 1965 (Malaysia) effectively transferred all legislative and executive powers previously possessed by the Federal Government to the new Government of Singapore. The Constitution of Singapore (Amendment) Act 1965 (Singapore) amended the Singapore State Constitution to alter the procedure required for constitutional amendment, and changed various nomenclatures to bring the Constitution in line with Singapore's independent status. Finally, the Republic of Singapore Independence Act 1965 (Singapore) provided, among other things, that certain provisions of the Malaysian Federal Constitution were to apply to Singapore. It also vested the powers relinquished by Malaysian executive and legislature in the executive and legislative branches of the Singapore Government.

However, no immediate changes were made to the judicial system after independence on 9 August 1965. For about four years after independence, appeals from the High Court of Singapore continued to lie to the Federal Court. It was only on 9 January 1970, when the Supreme Court of Judicature Act 1969 came into force, that Singapore re-established its own Supreme Court, comprising the High Court, the Court of Appeal and the Court of Criminal Appeal.

A shortage of High Court judges led to an amendment to Article 94 of the Constitution in 1971 to permit the appointment of supernumerary judges. These were judges who were engaged to continue their duties on a contractual basis after having reached the constitutionally-mandated retirement age of 65. A subsequent amendment to the Constitution created the position of judicial commissioner. This amendment took effect on 4 May 1979.

In 1993, a single permanent Court of Appeal was established for Singapore with its own President and Judges of Appeal, replacing the Court of Appeal and Court of Criminal Appeal. The first Judges of Appeal to be appointed, on 1 July 1993, were the late Justice M. Karthigesu and Justice L.P. Thean. Under the current constitution, the Court of Appeal is constituted by the Chief Justice and the Judges of the Court of Appeal.

With effect from 1 January 2015, the Constitution was amended to enable persons who have ceased to be judges of the Supreme Court to be appointed as Senior Judges; and persons who, in the Chief Justice's opinion, have the "necessary qualifications, experience and professional standing", to be International Judges. Senior Judges and International Judges may be appointed to hear specific cases or class of cases, or for specified periods. The office of International Judge was created to enable foreign judges, lawyers and academics to be appointed to hear cases in the Singapore International Commercial Court (SICC). The SICC was officially launched on 5 January 2015 and is a division of the General Division of the High Court. International Judges may be designated by the Chief Justice to hear cases in the SICC, and designated judges may hear appeals from the SICC.

No.	Judge	Birth and death dates	Term of service				
No.	Judge	Birth and death dates	Judicial Commissioner (or Acting Judge)	Judge	Judge of Appeal (or Federal Judge)	Chief Justice	Reappointment after retirement
1	Tan Ah Tah		1954 – 1 May 1955 (Acting Judge)	2 May 1955 – 30 September 1963 (Puisne Judge); 1 August 1963 – 30 November 1975 (Judge)	1964 – 24 April 1969 (Federal Judge)	18 August 1958 – 5 January 1959 (Acting Chief Justice)	—
2	Murray Buttrose		1954 (Acting Judge)	24 December 1956 – 31 July 1968 (1 July 1965 – 31 July 1968 (Supernumerary Judge)	—	—	25 August 1962 – 31 July 1968
3	Frederick Arthur Chua	15 May 1913 – 24 January 1994	—	15 February 1957 – 15 November 1992	—	—	16 November 1978 – 15 November 1992
4	Wee Chong Jin	28 September 1917 – 5 June 2005	—	15 August 1957 – 4 January 1963 (Puisne Judge)	—	5 January 1963 – 27 September 1990	29 September 1982 – 27 September 1990
5	James Walter Davy Ambrose		—	15 May 1958 – 1 March 1968	—	—	—
6	Alfred Victor Winslow		—	1 October 1962 – 5 April 1977	—	—	—
7	Thilliampalam Kulasekaram	1919–7 March 1988	—	28 August 1963 – 17 June 1984	—	—	—
8	Choor Singh	19 January 1911 – 31 March 2009	—	28 August 1963 – 30 November 1980	—	—	20 July 1976 – 30 November 1980
9	Denis Cosmas D'Cotta	Died 1983	—	1 March 1970 – 28 February 1981	—	—	2 March 1976 – 28 February 1981
10	Arumugam Ponnu Rajah	7 July 1911 – 28 September 1999	—	1 October 1976 – 28 September 1999	—	—	—
11	T. S. Sinnathuray	22 September 1930 – 18 January 2016	—	2 October 1978 – 22 September 1997	—	—	23 September 1995 – 22 September 1997
12	Abdul Wahab Ghows	30 January 1921 – 27 January 1997	—	3 January 1981 – 2 October 1986	—	—	
13	Lai Kew Chai	7 February 1941 – 27 February 2006	—	1 July 1981 – 7 February 2006	—	—	—
13	Thean Lip Ping (L. P. Thean)	23 February 1933 - 12 January 2024	—	1 February 1984 – 30 June 1993	1 July 1993 – 23 February 2002	—	24 February 1998 – 23 February 2002
15	Punch Coomaraswamy	Died 9 January 1999	—	10 September 1984 – 30 September 1993	—	—	17 October 1990 – 30 September 1993
16	Chan Sek Keong	Born 5 November 1937	1 July 1986 – 30 June 1988	1 July 1988 – 3 April 1992	5 January 2015 – 4 January 2018	11 April 2006 – 5 November 2012	5 January 2015 – 4 January 2018 (senior judge)
17	Joseph Grimberg	8 April 1933 – 17 August 2017	2 November 1987 – 5 November 1988; 2 January 1989 – 2 January 1990	—	—	—	—
18	Chao Hick Tin	Born 27 September 1942	1 October 1987 – 14 November 1990	15 November 1990 – 1 August 1999	2 August 1999 – 10 April 2006; 11 April 2008 – 27 September 2017 (Vice-President, Court of Appeal from 18 April 2008)	—	11 April 2008 – 27 September 2017; 5 January 2018 – 4 January 2021 (senior judge)
19	Tan Teow Yeow	1946? – 6 August 2008	15 March 1989 – 15 March 1991	—	—	—	—
20	Yong Pung How	11 April 1926 – 9 January 2020	—	1 July 1989 – 27 September 1990	—	28 September 1990 – 10 April 2006	12 April 1991 – 10 April 2006
21	Mootatamby Karthigesu	1923 – 21 July 1999	5 June 1990 – 14 November 1990	15 November 1990 – 30 June 1993	1 July 1993 – 21 July 1999	—	—
22	Rajendran s/o Sinnathamby		1 September 1990 – 31 December 1990	1 January 1991 – 22 October 2003	—	—	—
23	Goh Joon Seng	1935 – 15 June 2021	1 October 1990 – 14 November 1990	15 November 1990 – 21 March 2000	—	—	—
24	Goh Phai Cheng		14 January 1991 – 14 January 1994	—	—	—	—
25	Govinda Pannirselvam		1 March 1991 – 28 February 1994	1 March 1994 – 7 July 2001	—	—	—
26	Mohideen M.P. Haja Rubin		1 March 1991 – 28 February 1994	1 March 1994 – 3 February 2005	—	—	—
27	Kan Ting Chiu	Born 27 August 1946	2 May 1991 – 1 May 1994	2 May 1994 – 26 August 2011	—	—	5 January 2015 – 4 January 2018 (senior judge)
28	Lai Siu Chiu	Born 1948?	2 May 1991 – 1 May 1994	2 May 1994 – 30 October 2013	—	—	5 January 2015 – 4 January 2021 (senior judge)
28	K. S. Rajah	2 March 1930 – 17 June 2010	15 May 1991 – 2 March 1995	—	—	—	15 May 1994 – 2 March 1995
29	Michael Hwang		1 June 1991 – 31 December 1992		—	—	—
30	Warren L. H. Khoo		—	1 June 1991 – 13 August 1999	—	—	—
31	Amarjeet Singh s/o Jeswent Singh		2 January 1992 – 1 January 2001	—	—	—	—
32	Teong Quee Lim		1 April 1992 – 29 October 2000	—	—	—	—
33	Judith Prakash	Born 19 December 1951	1 April 1992 – 31 March 1995	1 April 1995 – 31 July 2016	1 August 2016 – present	—	19 December 2016 – 18 December 2021
34	Choo Han Teck	Born 21 February 1954	1 April 1995 – 1 January 2003	2 January 2003 – present	—	—	21 February 2019 – 20 February 2021
35	Christopher Lau Loke Sam		2 May 1995 – 1 May 1998	—	—	—	—
36	Chelva Ratnam Rajah		1 July 1995 – 30 June 1997	—	—	—	—
37	Tan Lee Meng	Born 7 July 1948	2 February 1997 – 31 July 1997	1 August 1997 – 7 July 2013	—	—	5 January 2015 – 4 January 2018 (senior judge)
38	Chan Seng Onn	Born 4 January 1954	15 October 1997 – 14 October 2000	2 July 2007 – present	—	—	4 January 2019 – 3 January 2021
39	Lee Seiu Kin	Born 30 January 1954	15 October 1997 – 14 October 2002	11 April 2006 – present	—	—	30 January 2019 – 29 January 2021
40	Tay Yong Kwang	Born 1956	15 October 1997 – 1 January 2003	2 January 2003 – 31 July 2016	1 August 2016 – present	—	—
41	Woo Bih Li	Born 31 December 1954	2 May 2000 – 1 January 2003	2 January 2003 – present	—	—	31 December 2019 – 30 December 2021
42	Belinda Ang Saw Ean	Born 24 April 1954	1 February 2002 – 1 January 2003	2 January 2003 – present	—	—	24 April 2019 – 23 April 2021
43	V. K. Rajah	Born 14 January 1957	2 January 2004 – 31 October 2004	1 November 2004 – 10 April 2007	11 April 2007 – 24 June 2014	—	—
44	Andrew Phang	Born 1958?	3 January 2005 – 7 December 2005	8 December 2005 – 27 February 2006	28 February 2006 – present (Vice-President, Court of Appeal from 28 September 2017)	—	—
45	Andrew Ang	Born 25 February 1946	15 May 2004 – 14 May 2005	15 May 2005 – 25 February 2014	—	—	26 February 2011 – 25 February 2014; 5 January 2015 – 4 January 2021 (senior judge)
46	Sundaresh Menon	Born 1962	3 April 2006 – 2 April 2007	—	1 August 2012 – 5 November 2012	6 November 2012 – present	—
47	Quentin Loh	Born 24 December 1950	1 September 2009 – 31 May 2010	1 June 2010 – 24 December 2020	—	—	25 December 2015 – 24 December 2020
48	Steven Chong	Born 1958	1 October 2009 – 31 May 2010	1 June 2010 – 24 June 2012; 25 June 2014 – 31 March 2017	1 April 2017 – present	—	—
49	Philip Nalliah Pillai	Born 12 December 1947	1 October 2009 – 31 May 2010	1 June 2010 – 11 December 2012	—	—	—
50	Vinodh Coomaraswamy	Born 1965	1 August 2012 – 23 June 2013	24 June 2013 – present	—	—	—
51	Lionel Yee	Born 1966?	1 February 2013 – 31 January 2014	—	—	—	—
52	George Wei	Born 1955?	1 August 2013 – 24 May 2015	25 May 2015 – 31 July 2018	—	—	—
53	Edmund Leow	Born 1963?	1 October 2013 – 30 September 2016	—	—	—	—
54	Tan Siong Thye	Born 22 June 1954	1 October 2013 – 30 June 2014	1 July 2014 – 1 February 2015; 1 April 2017 – present	—	—	22 June 2019 – 21 June 2021
55	Lee Kim Shin	Born 1960?	1 January – 31 December 2014	—	—	—	—
56	See Kee Oon	Born 1967?	14 April 2014 – 30 January 2017	31 January 2017 – present	—	—	—
57	Valerie Thean	Born 1969?	30 September 2014 – 29 September 2017	30 September 2017 – present	—	—	—
58	Aedit Abdullah	Born 1970?	17 November 2014 – 29 September 2017	30 September 2017 – present	—	—	—
59	Hoo Sheau Peng	Born 1970?	30 September 2014 – 29 September 2017	30 September 2017 – present	—	—	—
60	Debbie Ong	Born 1966?	17 November 2014 – 29 September 2017	30 September 2017 – present	—	—	—
61	Chua Lee Ming	Born 1960?	1 February 2015 – 30 January 2017	31 January 2017 – present	—	—	—
62	Foo Chee Hock	Born 1961?	1 April 2015 – 31 March 2018	—	—	—	—
63	Kannan Ramesh	Born 6 May 1965	22 May 2015 – 31 March 2017	1 April 2017 – present	—	—	—
64	Foo Tuat Yien	Born 1954?	25 May 2015 – 24 May 2018	—	—	—	—
65	Pang Khang Chau	Born 1971?	1 August 2016 – 31 July 2019	1 August 2019 – present	—	—	—
66	Audrey Lim		1 August 2016 – 31 July 2019	1 August 2019 – present	—	—	—

Judicial officers currently in office are highlighted: judges and judicial commissioners in yellow, and senior judges in green.

Notes

- Chan Sek Keong was the first person to be appointed a Judicial Commissioner on 1 July 1986. He served as Attorney-General between 1 May 1992 and 10 April 2006 before he was appointed as Chief Justice on 11 April 2006. In August 2008 he became the first Singaporean and local law graduate to become an honorary bencher of Lincoln's Inn.
- Chan Seng Onn was appointed Solicitor-General on 1 June 2001.
- The first woman judge, Lai Siu Chiu, was appointed on 2 May 1994.
- Wee Chong Jin was Singapore's first Asian Chief Justice and, having been appointed at the age of 45 years, also the youngest. In addition, having held the post for over 27 years, he was the longest-serving Chief Justice in Singapore and in a Commonwealth country.

=== The Registrar, Deputy Registrar, Senior Assistant Registrars, and Assistant Registrars ===
==== Qualifications ====
For a person to be appointed to be or to act as the Registrar, the Deputy Registrar or an Assistant Registrar, they must be a qualified person as defined in section 2 of the Legal Profession Act (see above).

==== Appointment ====
The Registrar, Deputy Registrar and Assistant Registrars of the Supreme Court are appointed by the President on the recommendation of the Chief Justice. These judicial officers are members of the Judicial Branch of the Singapore Legal Service, and it is the duty of the Legal Service Commission to appoint, confirm, emplace on the permanent or pensionable establishment, promote, transfer, dismiss and exercise disciplinary control over such officers.

As of 15 April 2009 the Registrar is Foo Chee Hock, while the Deputy Registrar is Audrey Lim Yoon Cheng.

==== Protection ====
The Registrar, the Deputy Registrar or an Assistant Registrar or other person acting judicially shall not be liable to be sued in any court exercising civil jurisdiction for any act done by them in the discharge of their judicial duty whether or not within the limits of their jurisdiction, provided that they at the time in good faith believed themself to have jurisdiction to do or order the act complained of.

== Judicial officers of the State Courts ==
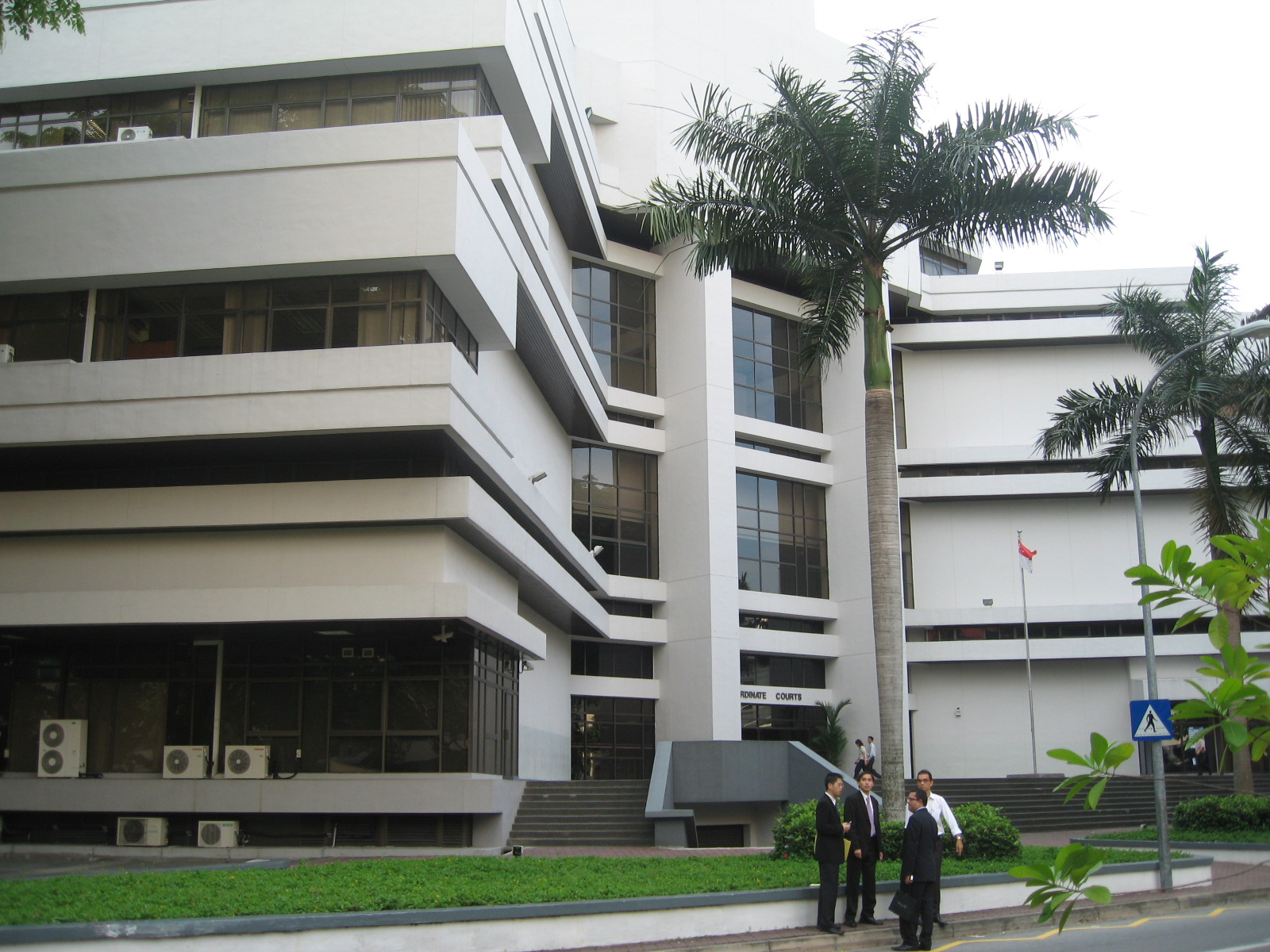
The State Courts Complex at Havelock Square, which houses the District Courts and Magistrates' Courts

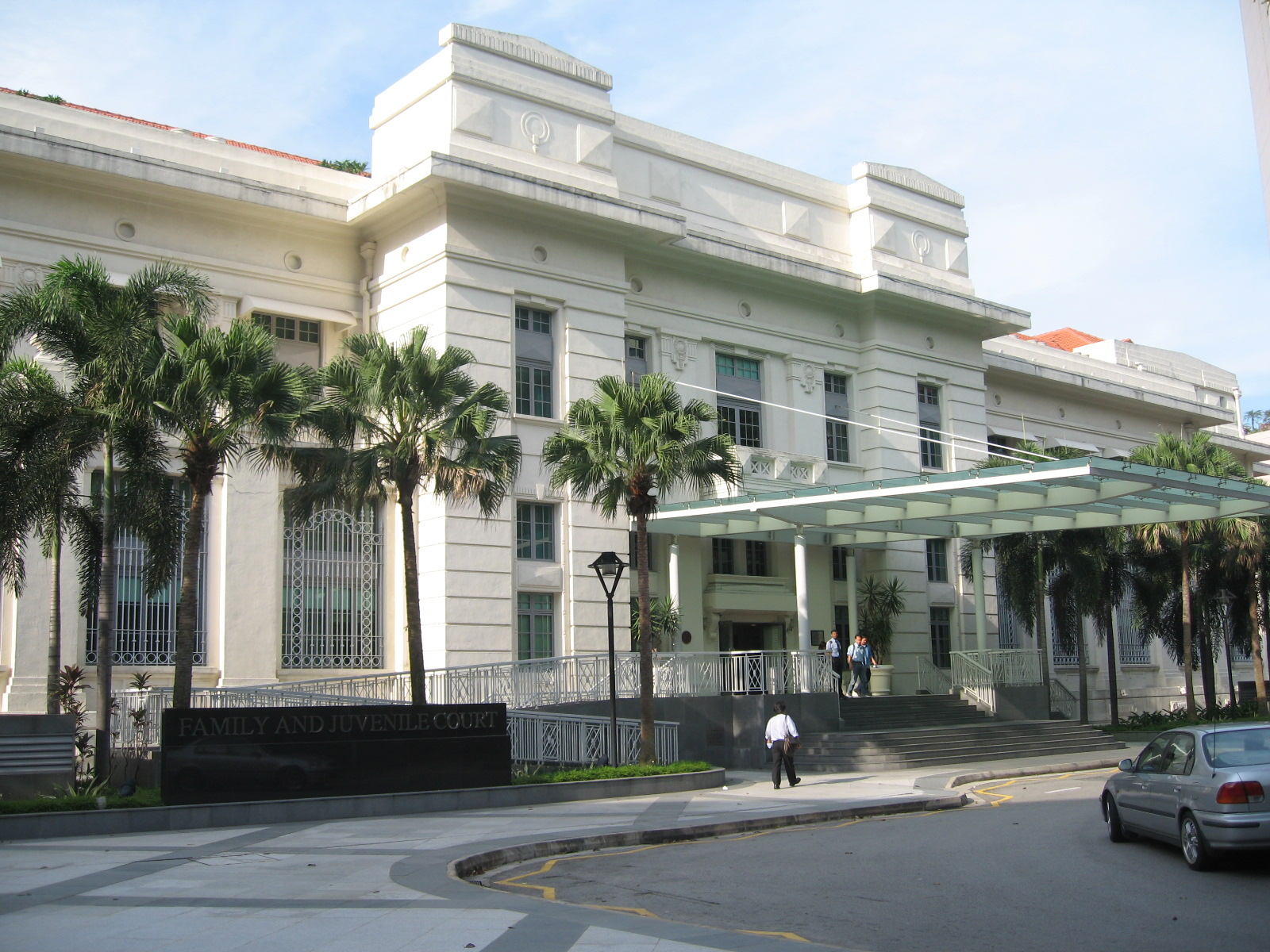
The Family and Juvenile Courts of Singapore are located in the former Ministry of Labour building, also in Havelock Square – both photographed in June 2006

The State Courts of Singapore are the District Courts, Magistrates' Courts, Coroners' Courts, Small Claims Tribunals and Employment Claims Tribunals.

The most senior judge of the State Courts is the Presiding Judge, who is a judge or judicial commissioner of the Supreme Court appointed by the President, acting on the advice of the Cabinet and upon the Chief Justice's recommendation. They have overall responsibility for the administration of the State Courts. The Presiding Judge may act as a judge in any State Court and exercise all the jurisdiction, power and privileges of a State Courts judge, while also sitting in the High Court or Court of Appeal. Justice See Kee Oon was appointed as Presiding Judge in 2014. The Presiding Judge is assisted by a Deputy Presiding Judge, who is also the Registrar of the State Courts. The other senior judicial officers are the principal district judges.

=== Qualifications ===
For a person to be appointed to be or to act as a District Judge, they must have been for not less than seven years a qualified person as defined in section 2 of the Legal Profession Act (see above). For a Magistrate, the corresponding period is three years.

The Registrar, Senior Deputy Registrar and Deputy Registrars are generally also required to be qualified persons within the meaning of the Legal Profession Act, although they are not required to have that status for any minimum period of time. However, the Chief Justice may, at their discretion, appoint any person who is not a qualified person under that Act.

=== Appointment ===
District Judges and Magistrates are appointed by the President on the recommendation of the Chief Justice. They hold concurrent appointments as the Registrar, Deputy Registrars, Coroners, and Referees of the Small Claims Tribunals. The Registrar, Senior Deputy Registrar and Deputy Registrars are appointed by the Chief Justice. District Judges, Magistrates and State Courts registrars are officers of the Judicial Branch of the Singapore Legal Service and are subject to the control of the Legal Service Commission.

Before exercising the functions of their office, all judicial officers must take and subscribe the following oath of office and allegiance before the Senior District Judge or a Judge of the Supreme Court:

I, [name], having been appointed to the office of [Senior District Judge, District Judge, Magistrate, Registrar or Deputy Registrar], do solemnly swear [or affirm] that I will faithfully discharge my judicial duties and I will do right to all manner of people after the laws and usages of the Republic of Singapore without fear or favour, affection or ill-will to the best of my ability, and I will be faithful and bear true allegiance to the Republic of Singapore.

=== Protection ===
Judicial officers are not liable to be sued for any act done by them in the discharge of their judicial duty whether or not within the limits of their jurisdiction, provided that they at the time in good faith believed themselves to have jurisdiction to do or order the act complained of.

== See also ==
- Judicial Commissioner
- Judicial system of Singapore
- Law of Singapore
- Supreme Court of Singapore
