= Andrew Ang =

Singaporean judge of the Supreme Court

Andrew Ang PBM
- 翁安得烈

Judge of the Supreme Court of Singapore
- In office 15 May 2005 – 25 February 2014
- Appointed by: S. R. Nathan

Judicial Commissioner of the Supreme Court of Singapore
- In office 15 May 2004 – 14 May 2005
- Appointed by: S. R. Nathan

Personal details
- Born: 25 February 1946 (age 80) Singapore
- Education: University of Singapore; Harvard University

Andrew Ang PBM (born 25 February 1946) is a Singaporean former judge of the Supreme Court. He obtained a Bachelor of Laws from the University of Singapore in 1971 and a Master of Laws from Harvard Law School in 1973. He lectured for a few years at the University of Singapore, and then worked as a lawyer at Messrs Lee & Lee for 30 years. He was appointed Judicial Commissioner in May 2004 and Judge in May 2005. After a decade on the Bench, he retired on 25 February 2014. In 2000, he was conferred the Pingat Bakti Masyarakat (PBM; Public Service Medal).

== Education and career as a lawyer ==
Ang was born in Singapore on 25 February 1946. Having graduated from the University of Singapore with a Bachelor of Laws in 1971, he joined the University's Faculty of Law as a lecturer the following year. He obtained a Master of Laws from Harvard Law School in 1973.

In 1974, he joined the law firm Lee & Lee, remaining there for 30 years until his retirement to join the Supreme Court Bench on 30 April 2004 as Senior Partner and Head of the Banking and Corporate Department.

During this time, he was also a member of the advisory panel of the Monetary Authority of Singapore, the board of Keppel Corporation, and the NUS Faculty of Law.

In his time as a lawyer, he was regularly cited as a leading lawyer who was "widely admired."

== Judicial career ==
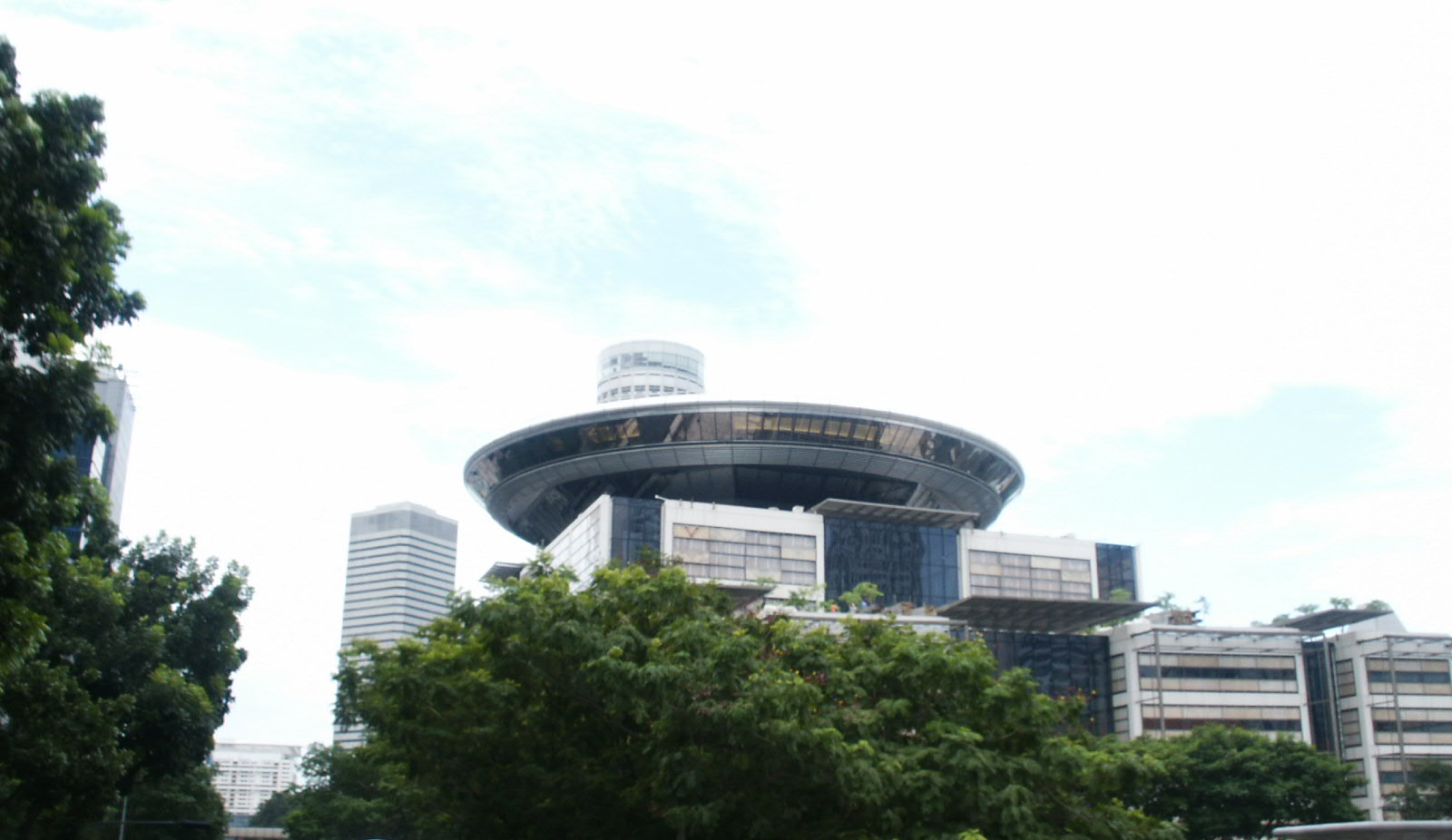
The Supreme Court of Singapore

Ang was appointed a Judicial Commissioner of the Supreme Court of Singapore on 15 May 2004, and a year later was elevated to the office of a Judge of the Supreme Court on 15 May 2005. He delivered about 170 written judgments, including Ngui Gek Lian Philomene v Chan Kiat (HSR International Realtors Pte. Ltd., intervener) (2013) in which he held that the S$590-million collective sale of Thomson View Condominium could not proceed because the marketing agent HSR International Realtors had paid some owners of units in the condominium to agree to the sale, thus breaching its duty to avoid a conflict of interest.

Ang also served as Chairman of the Singapore Mediation Centre (2006–2011) and the Legal Heritage Committee of the Singapore Academy of Law (2011–2014), and as Vice-Chairman of the Academy's Law Reform Committee (2006–2011). In addition, he was a member of the Advisory Board of the National University of Singapore Faculty of Law, and is currently on the Advisory Council of YMCA Singapore.

Upon reaching the retirement age of 65 years mandated by the Constitution on 25 February 2011, Ang was reappointed as a judge for another three years until he finally retired on 25 February 2014, having served a decade on the Bench. Upon his retirement, Chief Justice Sundaresh Menon said:

I congratulate Andrew on a remarkable career in the law. Over the course of forty-three years, he has been an academic, a private practitioner and a Judge of the Supreme Court. When he was appointed to the Bench, he brought with him the experience of three decades of practice. By then he was one of the country's leading corporate and tax lawyers. It has been a pleasure for me to work with Andrew as a colleague on the Bench. I thank him for the generous and warm spirit with which he has approached his work and interacted with his fellow Judges and staff of the court and I wish him a long, happy and fulfilling retirement.

== Later years ==
The Straits Times reported in February 2014 that Ang had been invited to rejoin his former law firm, Lee & Lee, as a consultant and would be undertaking arbitration and mediation work. In line with this, he is presently a senior mediator at the Singapore Mediation Centre and also a senior international mediator at Sage Mediation.

== Awards and honours ==
In 2000, Ang was conferred the Pingat Bakti Masyarakat (PBM; Public Service Medal).
