= Judith Prakash =

Singaporean judge in the Supreme Court (born 1951)

The Honourable Judith Prakash
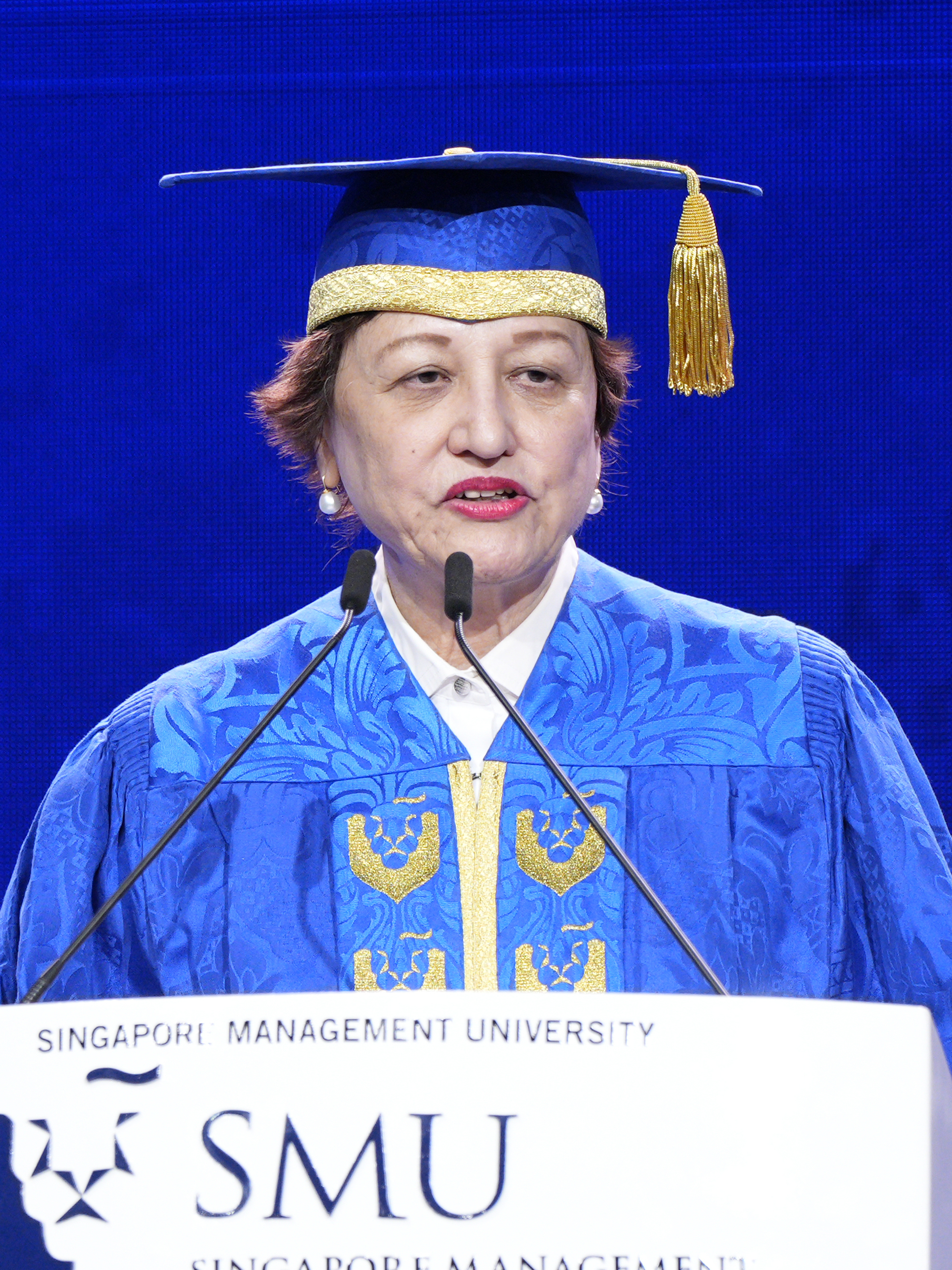
- Prakash speaking at SMU's Commencement, 2023

Senior Judge of the Supreme Court of Singapore
- Incumbent
- Assumed office 2 January 2024
- Appointed by: Tharman Shanmugaratnam

Judge of Appeal of the Court of Appeal
- In office 1 August 2016 – 18 December 2023
- Appointed by: Tony Tan

Judge of the Supreme Court
- In office 1 April 1995 – 31 July 2016
- Appointed by: Ong Teng Cheong

Judicial Commissioner of Singapore
- In office 1 April 1992 – 1 April 1995
- Appointed by: Wee Kim Wee

Personal details
- Born: Judith Evelyn de Cruz; 19 December 1951 (age 74)
- Education: University of Singapore; Raffles Girls' School (Secondary) Marymount Convent School

Judith Evelyn Jyothi Prakash (née de Cruz; born 19 December 1951) is a Singaporean judge in the Supreme Court. Prakash was appointed a permanent Judge of Appeal of the Court of Appeal of Singapore on 1 August 2016, the first woman to hold this post. During her time on the bench, she was also Judge of the Dubai International Financial Centre Courts, where she heard appeal matters.

== Education ==
After graduating from National University of Singapore in 1974, where she obtained a first-class honours degree, Prakash did her pupillage under David Marshall though she initially found the practice of criminal law not something that suited her.

== Career ==
In 1976, Prakash joined Drew & Napier's shipping department and later moved to its commercial department. She also practised in the areas of banking and finance.

In 1992, Prakash was appointed to the Supreme Court Bench as Judicial Commissioner.

Prakash was inducted in 2016 to the Singapore Women's Hall of Fame and previously chaired the Raffles' Girls School Board of Governors. She was, until 2022, the Lead Judge in the Supreme Court for arbitration matters.

On 14 October 2024, Prakash was conferred the Her World Woman of the Year 2024 for her pioneering work in the legal field and for paving the way for female legal professionals aspiring to be part of the judiciary. In its media release, the Editor in Chief of Her World said that given her professional journey, "Justice Judith Prakash is an inspiration, not just for those in the legal field, but also to all Singapore women."

Prakash had also previously chaired the Law Reform Committee and Publications Committee of the Singapore Academy of Law, and also sits on the Medical Litigation Review Committee which examines issues relating to medical litigation.

Prakash was a member of the sub-committee on the Review of Arbitration Laws, appointed by the Attorney-General in 1991, that made recommendations on Singapore's laws relating to international commercial arbitration and which led to the enactment of the International Arbitration Act in 1994.

On 15 June 2023, it was announced that Prakash will be appointed a Senior Judge as of 2 Jan 2024. In the course of her career till she was appointed as a Senior Judge, she has written approximately 645 judgments. Her judgements have been said to have had significant influence, especially in the areas of commercial law and arbitration. She has also been described as "an extraordinary jurist, a history maker, a class act and a truly wonderful human being" and a "tireless advocate for quality legal writing and publishing". As a Senior Judge, she will be hearing complex cases in the Court of Appeal.

In 2024, Prakash was welcomed as a guest member of the Supreme Court of India presiding over a matter involving tax related issues.

Prakash sits on the NUS Board of Trustees, the Board of Trustees of SINDA and on the Board of the Eurasian Association.

== Personal life ==
Prakash's brother is ambassador Simon Tensing de Cruz and she is married to Jaya Prakash, a noted independent arbitrator and mediator.
