= Judge of Singapore =

The term "Judge of Singapore" can refer to any of the following judicial officers:

== Senior judicial officers of Superior Courts ==
- A senior judicial officer of the Straits Settlements (27 November 1826 – 14 February 1942):
  - A recorder of the Court of Judicature of Prince of Wales' Island, Singapore and Malacca
  - A judge of the Supreme Court of the Straits Settlements
- A senior judicial officer of the Colony of Singapore (1 April 1946 – 2 June 1959):
  - A judge of the Supreme Court of the Colony of Singapore
- A senior judicial officer of the State of Singapore (3 June 1959 – 8 August 1965):
  - A judge of the Supreme Court of the State of Singapore
  - A judge of the High Court of Malaysia in Singapore
- A senior judicial officer of the Republic of Singapore (9 August 1965 – present):
  - A judge of the Supreme Court of the Republic of Singapore

== Senior judicial officers of Subordinate Courts ==
- A district judge or magistrate of the Subordinate Courts of Singapore
