= Foo Chee Hock =

Singaporean jurist and former college dean

The Honourable Judicial Commissioner Foo Chee Hock SC

Judicial Commissioner of Singapore
- In office 1 April 2015 – 31 March 2018
- Appointed by: Tony Tan

Personal details
- Education: National University of Singapore Faculty of Law (LLB); University of Cambridge (LLM)

Foo Chee Hock PBS SC is a Singaporean jurist and a former Dean of the Singapore Judicial College.

== Education ==
Foo graduated from St Joseph's Institution in 1976, where he is recognised as a "distinguished alumni", the National University of Singapore in 1984 and a Masters of Laws from Cambridge University in 1989.

== Legal career ==
Foo joined the Singapore Legal Service in 1984 and served in a variety of legal and judicial posts during that time, including as a Magistrate and District Judge in the then-Subordinate Courts, and as an Assistant Registrar and Deputy Registrar in the Supreme Court of Singapore. In 2009, he was appointed Registrar of the Supreme Court. In his time as Registrar, Foo assisted the Courts with the implementation of the “docket system” of case management and end-to-end e-Litigation systems and also was the “driving force that helped to demystify the judiciary and (make) the courts more accessible to the general public”. Foo has also previously spoken out about burn-out in the legal profession, given the real pressures of legal careers.

Foo was subsequently appointed as a Judicial Commissioner by President Tony Tan in April 2015. He served a three-year term during which time he also oversaw the development of the Singapore Judicial College, serving as its founding Dean, and in which capacity, he was tasked to "oversee the development of a new college for the training of judges". Upon his appointment as a Judicial Commissioner, he was replaced as the Registrar of the Supreme Court by Vincent Hoong.

At the conclusion of his term as Judicial Commissioner in 2019, Foo assumed full-time leadership of the Singapore Judicial College. He was also, during his time as Judicial Commissioner, Editor-in-Chief of Singapore Civil Procedure. He is also a senior mediator at the Singapore Mediation Centre. Foo retired from his position as Dean of the Singapore Judicial College in April 2023.

== Academic career ==
Foo is currently an Adjunct Professor at NUS Law School, where he teaches Pre-trial Advocacy in Civil Litigation and Reform of Civil Procedure.

== Awards ==
Foo received the Long Service Award in 2007. He was also appointed Senior Counsel (Honoris Causa) in 2019 in recognition of his “special knowledge in law and contributions to the development of the law and legal profession”.
