= Belinda Ang =

Singaporean judge of the Supreme Court

The Honourable Belinda Ang Saw Ean SC
- 洪素燕
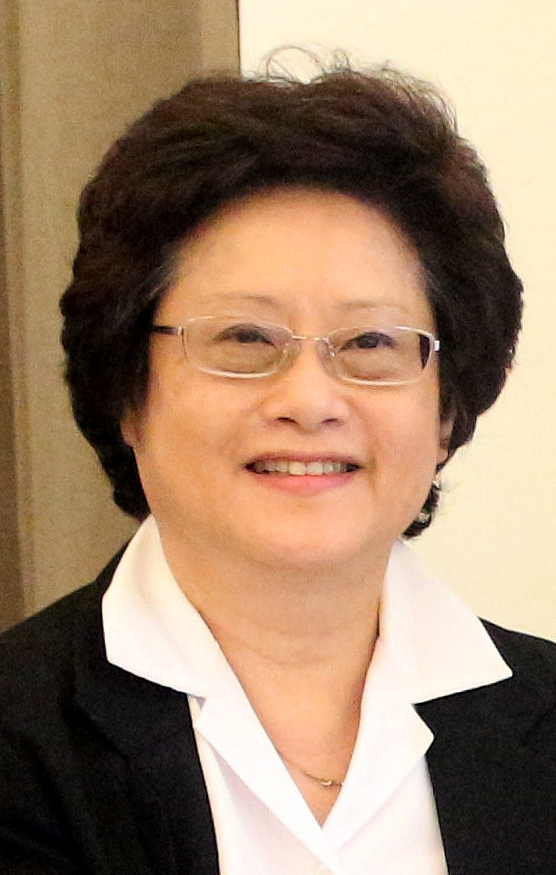
- Ang at the Singapore Mediation Centre in April 2016

Justice of the Court of Appeal of Singapore
- In office 1 November 2022 – 23 April 2026
- Nominated by: Lee Hsien Loong
- Appointed by: Halimah Yacob

Judge of the Appellate Division of the High Court of Singapore
- In office 2 January 2021 – 31 October 2022
- Nominated by: Lee Hsien Loong
- Appointed by: Halimah Yacob

Judge of the High Court of Singapore
- In office 2 January 2003 – 1 January 2021
- Nominated by: Goh Chok Tong; Lee Hsien Loong (2018)
- Appointed by: S. R. Nathan; Halimah Yacob (2018)

Judicial Commissioner of Singapore
- In office 1 February 2002 – 1 January 2003
- Nominated by: Goh Chok Tong
- Appointed by: S. R. Nathan

Personal details
- Born: 24 April 1954 (age 72) Singapore
- Website: Official website of the Supreme Court of Singapore

Belinda Ang
- Simplified Chinese: 洪素燕
Transcriptions
Standard Mandarin
- Hanyu Pinyin: Hóng Sù Yàn

Belinda Ang Saw Ean SC (born 24 April 1954) is a Singaporean former judge of the Court of Appeal.

== Education ==
Ang received her Bachelor of Laws from the University of Wales, Aberystwyth in 1976 and her Master of Laws (with distinction) from the University College London.

== Career ==
She was appointed Judicial Commissioner in February 2002, Judge of the Supreme Court in January 2003, Judge of the Appellate Division of the Supreme Court in January 2021, and Justice of the Court of Appeal of the Supreme Court in November 2022. Prior to these appointments, she joined Godwin & Co in 1980 and was made junior partner in 1983. She founded Ang & Partners in 1985, and was appointed Senior Counsel in 1998. She is a member of the senate and executive committee of the Singapore Academy of Law, and is chairperson of the Singapore Mediation Centre.
