= Lai Siu Chiu =

Singaporean lawyer and judge

- Born: 1948 (age 77–78); Malacca
- Occupations: Judge, lawyer

Lai Siu Chiu (Chinese: 賴秀珠; pinyin: Lài Xiùzhū; born 1948), is a Singaporean lawyer and judge. She is the first woman to serve as a Judicial Commissioner in Singapore and to serve on the Supreme Court of Singapore as a judge.

== Biography ==
Lai was born in Malacca. She attended Malacca High School where she was discouraged from going into journalism by the headmaster and finally decided to go into law instead. In 1972, Lai graduated from the University of Singapore and then went on to get her master's degree in 1977 from the University of London. Lai joined the bar in Singapore in 1973. She began to practice law soon after graduating and was known for being one of a few women in law to take litigation cases at the time. She says that she enjoyed doing litigation work and later it would help her as a judge. Lai started practicing law at M/s Sim Teow Gok & Co. She then worked for the firm Allen & Gledhill until she became a judge in 1991. She made senior partner at the firm in 1980.

Lai became the first woman to serve as a Judicial Commissioner on May 2, 1991. On April 30, 1994, she was sworn in as the first female High Court Judge to the Supreme Court of Singapore.

She retired from the Supreme Court on October 30, 2013. In 2015, she returned to the Supreme Court when she was appointed to become a senior judge of the court. She was the only woman to be appointed as a senior judge.

In 2016, Lai was inducted into the Singapore Women's Hall of Fame.

Lai became the first deputy chair of the Children's Charities Association in the 1980s and later became chair of the organization. Between 2006 and 2013, she was the chair of the Membership and Social Committee of the Singapore Academy of Law. Lai has also been very involved in the Yellow Ribbon Fund (YRF) for rehabilitation of ex-offenders.

== See also ==
- First women lawyers around the world
