= Bala Reddy =

Singaporean lawyer

- Born: 1955 (age 70–71)
- Education: National University of Singapore Trinity Hall, University of Cambridge
- Occupations: Senior Principal District Judge, State Courts of Singapore
- Known for: Criminal Law; Admiralty law; Community Justice
- Term: 2014 – present
- Honours: Pingat Pentadbiran Awam - Perak (Public Administration Medal)

Bala Reddy (Tamil: பாலா ரெட்டி) is a Singaporean senior lawyer. He is presently the senior principal district judge and director of the Community Justice and Tribunals division in the State Courts of Singapore. Reddy is an authority in international criminal justice systems and served as a legal expert for the United Nations Development Programme as well as the United Nations Convention against Corruption. Prior to his judicial appointment to the State Courts in 2014, Reddy was the Chief Prosecutor in the Attorney-General's Chambers of Singapore during Justice Steven Chong's tenure as Attorney-General.

== Early life and education ==
Bala Reddy was born in Singapore on 18 September 1955 to parents who had migrated from Madurai, India. He graduated from the National University of Singapore (University of Singapore) Faculty of Law where he was conferred the Bachelor of Laws and Master of Laws degrees. He subsequently also qualified as a barrister in Singapore, Brunei, England and Wales. In 1991, he was awarded a Singapore Legal Service Commission scholarship to pursue an MPhil in Criminology at Trinity Hall, University of Cambridge where he was supervised by the distinguished criminologist, Nigel Walker. In 1999, Reddy was awarded a Legal Service sponsorship to join the Program for Management Development at Harvard Business School.

== Legal practice and judicial career ==
Reddy began his career in private legal practice specializing as an arbitrator in Admiralty, Banking and Insurance law. In 1985, he joined the Singapore Legal Service, an autonomous wing of the Public Service Commission. He was appointed a Deputy Public Prosecutor and State Counsel in the Attorney General's Chambers (AGC) and represented Singapore at several international negotiations including the United Nations Convention against Transnational Organised Crime and the United Nations Development Programme to strengthen the legal capacity of Vietnam. After 20 years of service in the AGC, Reddy was appointed as a judge in the State Courts of Singapore in 2005. In 2015, Reddy joined the faculty of the SMU School of Law where he leads the seminar course "Evidence, Litigation & Criminal Process".

=== Community court ===
Reddy is a proponent of favoring comprehensive community-level justice solutions (as opposed to traditional punitive custodial sentences) to rehabilitate and reintegrate minor offenders from vulnerable groups back into the community. As a judicial officer in the State Courts, he spearheaded the introduction of the community court model and in 2006, Reddy presided over the inaugural Community Court in Singapore. The first problem-solving court in Asia; the community court "adopts a non-traditional, multi-disciplinary team approach and explores sentencing alternatives" such as counseling, rehabilitation and community service to discourage recidivism.
