= Liu Lizhi =

Liu Lizhi (Chinese: 劉立之, 958-1048), courtesy name Sili, was a Chinese scholar-official of the Northern Song dynasty who served in several regional and central government posts. He is noted for his remarkable determination, having passed the prestigious imperial examination at a young age despite family hardship. He became the patriarch of a distinguished family, as his sons, Liu Chang and Liu Fen, were among the most celebrated scholars of their generation.

== Biography ==
Liu Lizhi was born in 958. His father, Liu Shi (劉式), was also an official. Liu Shi was skilled in financial management and made significant contributions to the early Song dynasty's fiscal policies. However, due to his overly strict supervision during audits, he was accused by others and dismissed from office. During the reign of Emperor Zhenzong, Liu Shi died in resentment and frustration at the age of 49. Upon his father's death, the family's situation was modest, with only his eldest brother, Liu Liben (劉立本), holding a government post at the time. His younger brothers, Liu Lide and Liu Lili, were both successful candidates in the imperial examination.

According to historical records, Liu Lizhi was just 13 years old when his father died. Despite his youth and the difficult circumstances, he dedicated himself to arduous and diligent study. His efforts paid off when, in the first year of the Dazhong Xiangfu era (1008 AD) during the reign of Emperor Zhenzong, he successfully passed the highest level of the imperial examination and earned the coveted Jinshi (進士) degree. His success at such a young age was considered exceptional. He was first appointed as County Deputy of Lianjiang, then Registrar of Qingxi, Imperial Academician at the Imperial Academy (Guozi Boshi), Transport Commissioner of the Yizhou Circuit, and later Magistrate of Nanling. He was transferred to the Court of Judicial Review (Dali Temple) as an assistant official, then appointed as Magistrate of Jinhua County, and later transferred to Zhongjiang. He was promoted to Assistant Prefect (Tongpan) of Luzhou and gradually advanced to the positions of Assistant Director of the Ministry of Works (Yubu Yuanwailang) and the Ministry of Revenue (Bibu Yuanwailang) in 1035. He was appointed as the Governor of Yizhou in 1036. When the position of Judicial Commissioner was reinstated across various circuits, Liu Lizhi was assigned to the Fujian Circuit. He served in Fujian for three years before being promoted to Investigating Judge of Kaifeng Prefecture (Kaifeng Fu Tuiguan).

Liu Lizhi has three sons, Liu Ban, Liu Chang (劉敞; 1019–1068), and Liu Fen (劉攽; 1023–1089). Both became highly influential scholars, historians, classicists, and officials. Liu Chang was a famous essayist and expert on the Confucian classics, while Liu Fen was a respected historian who contributed to the compilation of the New Tang History (Xīn Táng Shū).

== Family ==
- Father: Liu Shi (Chinese:劉式)
- Son: Liu Chang (Chinese:劉敞)
- Son: Liu Ban (Chinese:劉攽)
- Son: Liu Fang (Chinese:劉放)
- Son-in-law: Zhang Feng (Chinese:張諷)
- Father-in-law: Wang Li (Chinese:王礪)
- Nephew: Liu Yu (Chinese:劉敔)
- Wife: Wang Shi (Chinese:王氏-劉立之妻)
