= James Walter Davy Ambrose =

Malaysian judge (1909–1992)

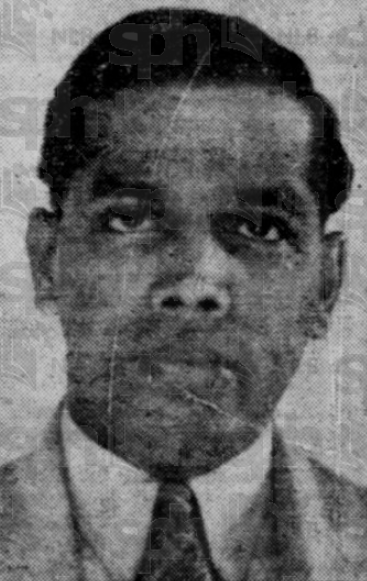
- Ambrose in 1939
- Born: 5 December 1909; Penang, Straits Settlements
- Died: 28 October 1992 (aged 82); Singapore
- Education: Keble College, Oxford
- Occupations: Lawyer, puisne judge

James Walter Davy Ambrose (5 December 1909 – 28 October 1992) was a Malaysian lawyer and puisne judge of the Supreme Court of Singapore. Born in Penang, Straits Settlements, he was the first Indian in Malaya to be appointed a puisne judge.

== Early life and education ==
Ambrose was born on 5 December 1909 in Penang, the son of Samuel Ambrose. He was educated at Penang Free School where he was an exceptional student, leading the Cambridge list passes in Penang with four distinctions and winning the Queen's Scholarship. In 1929, he proceeded to Keble College, Oxford where he took his BA followed two years later by his BCL. In 1935, he was called to the Bar at the Inner Temple.

== Career ==
After qualifying as a barrister in England, Ambrose returned to Penang where he joined the firm of Wreford and Thornton, and was admitted as a solicitor and advocate of the Straits Settlements in 1936. After practising for a few months, he was appointed official assignee, assistant registrar of companies and assistant official receiver in Singapore. In 1940, he joined the Straits Settlements Legal Service and transferred to Malacca where he served successively as assistant official assignee; magistrate and assistant district judge; registrar of the Superior Court of Malacca from 1940 to 1945, and deputy public prosecutor in 1946. From 1947 to 1952, he served as senior assistant registrar of the Supreme Courts of Ipoh, Penang, and Kuala Lumpur before he returned to Penang as President of the Sessions Court in 1953.

Ambrose then joined the Colonial Legal Service and transferred to Singapore where he served as acting district judge and first magistrate, and official assignee, public trustee, and commissioner of estate duties (1955–1957). In 1958, he was appointed puisne judge of the Supreme Court of Singapore, the first Indian in Malaya to be appointed a puisne judge and only the fourth Asian to hold the position. He retired from office after ten years on the bench in 1968.

== Personal life and death ==
Ambrose married Theresa Kamala Ambrose in 1945. The couple had no children. Ambrose was a keen badminton player. Regarded as one of the best players in the country, he played for Oxford against Cambridge, and was the first foreign student at Oxford to be awarded Varsity colours for badminton.

Ambrose died on 28 October 1992, aged 82.
