= Singapore Academy of Law =

Legal industry promotion and development agency

Agency overview
- Formed: 1 November 1988; 37 years ago
- Headquarters: 1 Supreme Court Lane, Singapore 178879
- Agency executives: Chief Justice Sundaresh Menon, President; Yeong Zee Kin, Chief Executive
- Website: sal.org.sg
- Agency ID: T09GB0002H

The Singapore Academy of Law (SAL) is a promotion and development agency for Singapore's legal industry. SAL also undertakes statutory functions such as stakeholding services and the appointment of Senior Counsel, Commissioners for Oaths and Notaries Public. It also organises the annual TechLaw.Fest with the Ministry of Law (MinLaw) and MP International. The conference is a global gathering of legal and tech professionals and has featured speakers like Sir Tim Berners-Lee and Law Minister K. Shanmugam.

SAL has 3 sub-brands: Singapore Law Watch, Academy Publishing, and LawNet (known as Legal Workbench in Malaysia).

SAL also has 3 subsidiaries: Singapore Mediation Centre, Asian Business Law Institute, and LawNet Technology Services.

SAL has designated the Yellow Ribbon Fund as the sole beneficiary of its charity efforts since 2011.

== History ==
The Singapore Academy of Law Act was created by an Act of Parliament on 1 November 1988, and had its City Hall premises officially opened by former Prime Minister Lee Kuan Yew. With the Singapore Academy of Law (Amendment) Act passed in 1995, SAL's functions were expanded to include development of legal infrastructure and services.

== Management ==
=== Senate ===
SAL is led by a Senate headed by Chief Justice Sundaresh Menon, and comprising the Attorney-General, the Supreme Court Bench and key leaders of the various branches of the legal profession. It has more than 12,000 members, including the Bench, all persons who are called as advocates and solicitors of the Supreme Court (i.e. the Bar) or appointed as Legal Service Officers, corporate counsel, faculty members of the three local law schools (i.e. National University of Singapore, Singapore Management University and Singapore University of Social Sciences) and foreign lawyers in Singapore.

=== Executive committee ===
SAL's Executive Board oversees major decision making and provides strategic direction for the development of SAL's role in the Singapore legal industry. The Executive Board comprises 12 members from both the judiciary and the private sector.

=== Work of the Academy ===
The scope of SAL's work as a promotion and development agency covers four "Cs":

1. Creating knowledge and know-how
2. Catalysing ideas, insights and innovation
3. Capability building with tools and technology
4. Connecting the legal community

This work is carried out by 5 clusters:

- The Legal Education cluster comprises 3 divisions: Conference & Seminars, Training (workshops & courses) and e-Lex (eLearning programmes).
- The Legal Knowledge and Publishing cluster has the following functions: Academy Publishing, Law Reporting and Legal Heritage.
- The Legal Development cluster oversees Professional Affairs, International Promotion of Singapore Law, Law Reform, Singapore Law Watch and SAL Scholarships.
- The Legal Technology cluster developed and manages LawNet and the Electronic Litigation Systems.
- The Corporate Development and Services cluster is in charge of Statutory Services (Authentication, Appointments, Membership and Stakeholding), Business Development, Communications, Finance and Treasury functions, as well as internal corporate services. It also undertakes the work related to the Future Law Innovation Programme (FLIP).

=== Management ===
Chief Executive
Date	Name	Remarks
1997 - 7 February 2021	Serene Wee	Director since at least 1997
8 February 2021 - 7 February 2023	Rama Tiwari	
8 February 2023 - 28 February 2023	Serene Wee	Interim Chief Executive
1 April 2023 - present	Yeong Zee Kin	

== Timeline ==
- 1988 – The Singapore Academy of Law Act is passed by Parliament. LawNet is first incepted as a dial up network access provider.
- 1989 – The SAL Restaurant is opened, serving local and Western fare. Members were to be suitably dressed when dining there.
- 1990 – Former Prime Minister, Mr Lee Kuan Yew, officiates the opening of SAL premises at City Hall.
- 1995 – SAL's functions expand to include development of legal infrastructure and services in Singapore.
- 1996 – The appointment of Commissioners for Oaths, the appointment of Notaries Public and legislation of documents for international use was transferred from the Attorney-General's Chambers to SAL.
- 1997 – Launch of Singapore Mediation Centre by former Chief Justice Yong Pung How. Commencement of stakeholding services for residential and commercial properties in Singapore.
- 2000 – Electronic Filing System is introduced in conjunction with LawNet's 10th anniversary.
- 2005 – Relocation of premises to the new Supreme Court building. The SAL Restaurant is closed and replaced by the Academy Bistro.
- 2006 – Former Chief Justice Yong Pung How retires as President of SAL and is replaced by Chief Justice Chan Sek Keong.
- 2007 – SAL restructures into Legal Knowledge, Legal Technology and Legal Industry. SAL's publishing division, Academy Publishing, was officially launched by Chief Justice Chan Sek Keong. LawNet 2, a revamped LawNet portal, was launched with more user-friendly features and email alerts.
- 2008 – Launch of Singapore Law Watch, a daily legal news service for the legal community and public.
- 2012 – Former Chief Justice Chan Sek Keong retires as President of SAL. He is succeeded by Chief Justice Sundaresh Menon, who takes over as President of SAL.
- 2013 – SAL celebrates its 25th anniversary with the aim to raise public awareness about legal rights.
- 2016 – SAL sets up two new subsidiaries: (1) the Asian Business Law Institute (ABLI) – to conduct and facilitate research, and produce authoritative texts in the field of Asian legal development with the view to promote the convergence of Asian business laws; and (2) the Singapore International Dispute Resolution Academy (SIDRA) – the first regional hub training in negotiation and dispute resolution.
- 2017 – SAL expands its office premises to The Adelphi. The Legal Education Framework for Training and Education (LIFTED) and Specialist Accreditation Scheme are launched by Chief Justice Sundaresh Menon at the Opening of Legal Year 2017. The Legal Technology Vision and FLIP are also announced.
- 2018 – The inaugural TechLaw.Fest is held.

== Controversies ==
On 1 February 2023, the SAL published a commentary by Harpreet Singh Nehal questioning the decision by the Singapore authorities not to prosecute former senior management of Keppel Offshore & Marine for bribery. The Corrupt Practices Investigation Bureau had issued stern warning to the former senior management in lieu of prosecution for corruption-related offences. However, the commentary was no longer available on the SAL's website by the afternoon of 2 February 2023.

SAL stated in response to media queries that the article "was not within the editorial parameters of Singapore Law Watch which are focused on commentaries on the latest Singapore Supreme Court judgments and articles on recent legislative changes".

On 6 February 2023, SAL announced that its then-Chief Executive, Rama Tiwari, would be stepping down "on the expiry of his current contract". In response to media queries, the SAL clarified that Tiwari's decision to step down had been finalised in December 2022 and was not linked to commentary which had been taken down several days earlier. SAL also explained that "Mr Tiwari was not involved in either the decision to publish the commentary or in the subsequent decision to take it down."
