= Judicial commissioner =

Person appointed on a non-permanent basis to a judicial office

A judicial commissioner is person appointed on a non-permanent basis to a judicial office. In some countries, such as Malaysia and Singapore, judicial commissioners have the powers of full judges. In other jurisdictions their powers are limited.

== Brunei Darussalam ==
A number of serving and retired Hong Kong High Court Judges are appointed by the Sultan to sit as Supreme Court Judges and Judicial Commissioners in Brunei. For example, while Mr Justice Rogers served as Vice President of the Hong Kong Court of Appeal, he also sat as a non-resident Judicial Commissioner of the Supreme Court of Brunei Darussalam between 2010 and 2011. As of 2020, three retired Hong Kong High Court Judges sit as Judges of the Court of Appeal of Brunei Darussalam (Mr Justice Burrell, who is the President of the Brunei Court of Appeal, and Mr Justice Seagroatt and Mr Justice Lunn, who are Justices of Appeal); two retired Hong Kong High Court Judges sit as Judicial Commissioners of the Supreme Court of Brunei Darussalam (Mr Justice Findlay and Mr Justice Lugar-Mawson). Further, another retired Hong Kong Judge, Edward Woolley, who previously served as Registrar of the Court of Final Appeal, Deputy High Court Judge and High Court Master, sits as a Judicial Commissioner of the Supreme Court of Brunei Darussalam. Justice Kannan Ramesh of the Supreme Court of Singapore also sits as a Judicial Commissioner of the Supreme Court of Brunei Darussalam.

== Hong Kong ==
In 1983, the position of Commissioner of the High Court was re-named as Deputy Judge of the High Court.

== Malaysia ==
In Malaysia judicial commissioners are appointed for a term of two years. Judicial commissioners are elected under Article of 122AB Federal Constitution and must go through the selection process by Judicial Appointments Commission (Suruhanjaya Pelantikan Kehakiman) if applied pursuant to Section 29 Judicial Appointments Commission Act 2009.

== Singapore ==
In Singapore, judicial commissioners are appointed to the Supreme Court by the president of Singapore on the constitutional advice of the prime minister of Singapore, and have the powers of a judge.

People may be appointed a judicial commissioner after being a "qualified person" within the meaning of Section 2 of the Legal Profession Act and/or a member of the Singapore Legal Service for at least ten years. The appointment is for a specific period which is determined by the president of Singapore.

Many judicial commissioners went on to become judges of the Supreme Court, such as Andrew Phang Boon Leong, Tay Yong Kwang, Belinda Ang Saw Ean, Tan Lee Meng and V. K. Rajah.

== United States ==
=== California ===
Superior court commissioners are subordinate judicial officers who are appointed by, and serve at the pleasure of, the superior court judges.

=== Tennessee ===
In Tennessee, judicial commissioners may be appointed at a county level to handle minor criminal matters.

=== Wisconsin ===
Similarly, in Wisconsin, a court commissioner is an attorney appointed by a county's circuit court judges to handle small claims, preliminary criminal proceedings, and family court cases.
