= Singapore Legal Service =

National system of lawyers

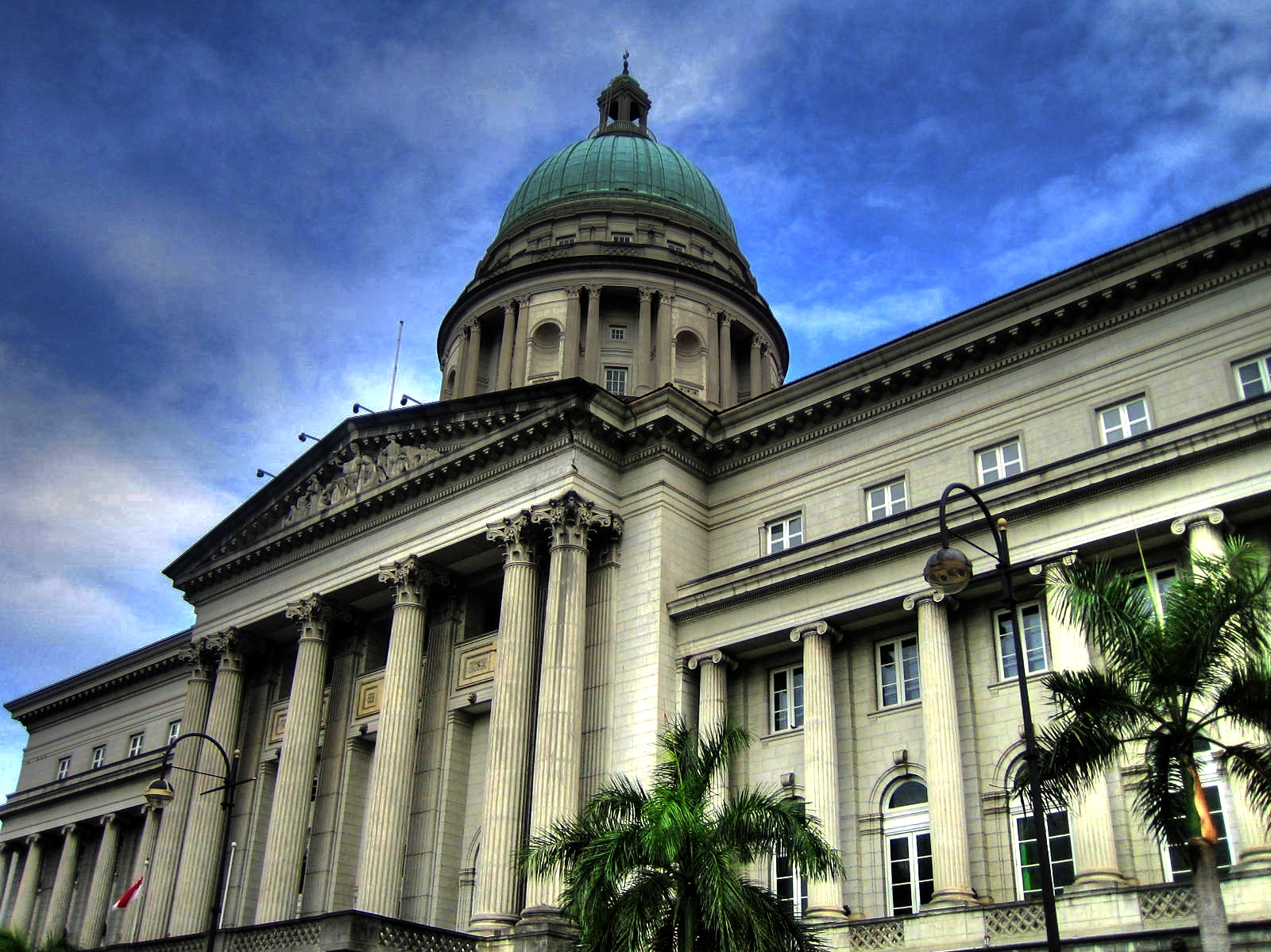
Old Supreme Court Building, Singapore

The Singapore Legal Service is the collective body of lawyers who work in the courts, the Attorney-General's Chambers, and the legal departments of various government ministries and statutory boards in Singapore. Lawyers who are a part of the legal service are known as Legal Service Officers (LSO).

The legal service is an autonomous part of the Singapore Public Service. The employment of LSOs is the responsibility of the service alone, and is independent of the Civil Service of Singapore. The Legal Service Commission, established under Article 111 of the Singapore Constitution, controls the appointment, dismissal, and disciplinary action of members of the Service.

There were 307 Legal Service Officers as of 31 December 2008—about 10% of Singapore's practising lawyers. The current president of the legal service is Chief Justice Sundaresh Menon.

== See also ==
- Judicial system of Singapore
- Singapore Civil Service
