= Supreme Court of Singapore =

National supreme court

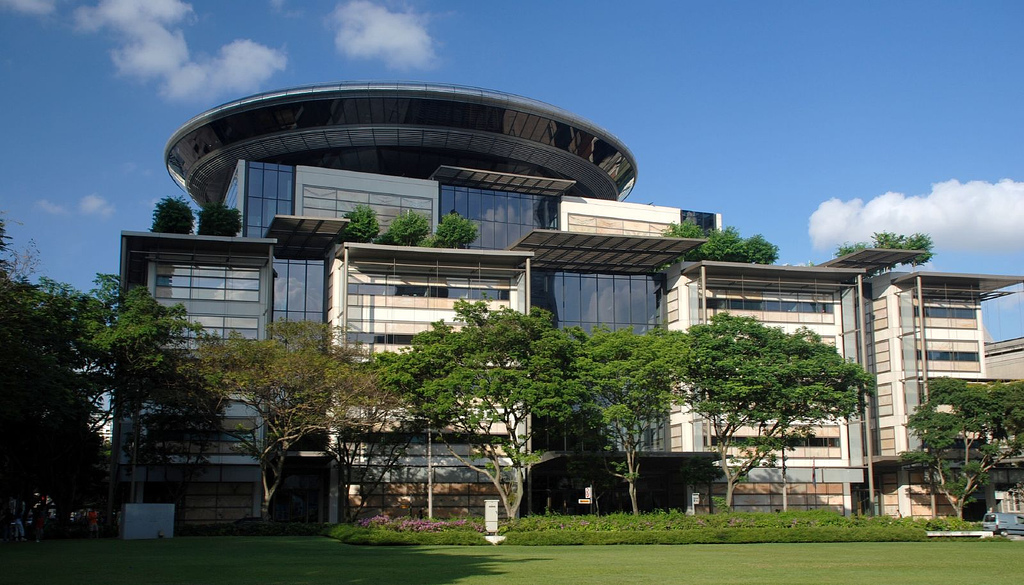
- The new Supreme Court Building opened in 2005, designed by Norman Foster
- Interactive map of Supreme Court of Singapore
- 1°17′26″N 103°51′2″E
- Established: 9 January 1970; 56 years ago
- Coordinates: 1°17′26″N 103°51′2″E
- Composition method: Executive selection
- Authorised by: Constitution of Singapore
- Judge term length: Tenure until the age of 65, but may be re-appointed
- Website: www.judiciary.gov.sg

Chief Justice of Singapore
- Currently: Sundaresh Menon
- Since: 6 November 2012

Supreme Court of Singapore

Chinese name
- Chinese: 新加坡最高法院
Transcriptions
Standard Mandarin
- Hanyu Pinyin: Xīnjiāpō zuìgāo fǎyuàn

Malay name
- Malay: Mahkamah Agung Singapura

Tamil name
- Tamil: சிங்கப்பூர் உச்சநீதிமன்றம்

The Supreme Court of Singapore is a set of courts in Singapore, comprising the Court of Appeal and the High Court. It hears both civil and criminal matters. The Court of Appeal hears both civil and criminal appeals from the High Court. The Court of Appeal may also decide a point of law reserved for its decision by the High Court, as well as any point of law of public interest arising in the course of an appeal from a court subordinate to the High Court, which has been reserved by the High Court for decision of the Court of Appeal.

Under changes in 2021 made due to the increasing volume and complexity of civil appeals, the High Court was in effect sub-divided into two divisions, the General Division and the Appellate Division. The General Division took over the jurisdiction of the High Court, while the Appellate Division was a new court formed to hear those civil appeals from the General Division that are not allocated to the Court of Appeal. The Appellate Division has only civil appellate jurisdiction, and appeals from it to the Court of Appeal are allowed only in limited cases with leave. (In the following, references to the High Court should now be read as references to the General Division).

The High Court's jurisdiction is as follows: generally, a civil case is commenced in the High Court if the subject matter of the claim exceeds S$250,000. Probate matters are dealt with in the High Court if the value of the estate exceeds S$3 million or if the case involves the resealing of a foreign grant. In addition, ancillary matters in family proceedings involving assets of S$1.5 million or above are heard in the High Court.

Criminal cases involving offences which carry the death penalty and generally those punishable with imprisonment for a term exceeding ten years, are prosecuted in the High Court. Non-bailable offences are generally tried in the High Court. As a rule of thumb, the High Court in Singapore has inherent jurisdiction to try all matters within Singapore.

== History ==
The earliest predecessor of the Supreme Court was the Court of Judicature of Prince of Wales' Island (now Penang), Singapore and Malacca, which was established by the Second Charter of Justice, issued by the Crown as letters patent dated 27 November 1826. The Court was presided over by the Governor of the Straits Settlements and Resident Councillor of the settlement where the court was to be held, and another judge called the Recorder. The Third Charter of Justice of 12 August 1855 reorganised the Court, providing the Straits Settlements with two Recorders, one for Prince of Wales' Island and the other for Singapore and Malacca. Following the reconstitution of the Straits Settlements as a Crown colony with effect from 1 April 1867, the Court of Judicature was replaced by the Supreme Court of the Straits Settlements. The Governor and Resident Councillors ceased to be judges of the Court. Further changes to the Court's constitution were made in 1873. It now consisted of two divisions – the Chief Justice and the Senior Puisne Judge formed the Singapore and Malacca division of the Court, while the Judge of Penang and the Junior Puisne Judge formed the Penang division. The Supreme Court also received jurisdiction to sit as a Court of Appeal in civil matters. In 1878 the jurisdiction and residence of judges was made more flexible, thus impliedly abolishing the geographical division of the Supreme Court. Appeals from decisions of the Supreme Court lay first to the Court of Appeal and then to the Queen-in-Council, the latter appeals being heard by the Judicial Committee of the Privy Council.

As a result of legislation passed in 1885, the Supreme Court consisted of the Chief Justice and three puisne judges. The Court was significantly altered in 1907. It now had two divisions, one exercising original civil and criminal jurisdiction and the other appellate civil and criminal jurisdiction.

During the Japanese occupation of Singapore (1942–1945), all the courts that had operated under the British were replaced by new courts established by the Japanese Military Administration. The Syonan Koto-Hoin (Supreme Court) was formed on 29 May 1942; there was also a Court of Appeal, but it was never convened. Following the end of World War II, the courts that had existed before the war were restored. There was no change in the judicial system when the Straits Settlements were dissolved in 1946, and Singapore became a crown colony in its own right, except that the Supreme Court of the Straits Settlements became known as the Supreme Court of Singapore.

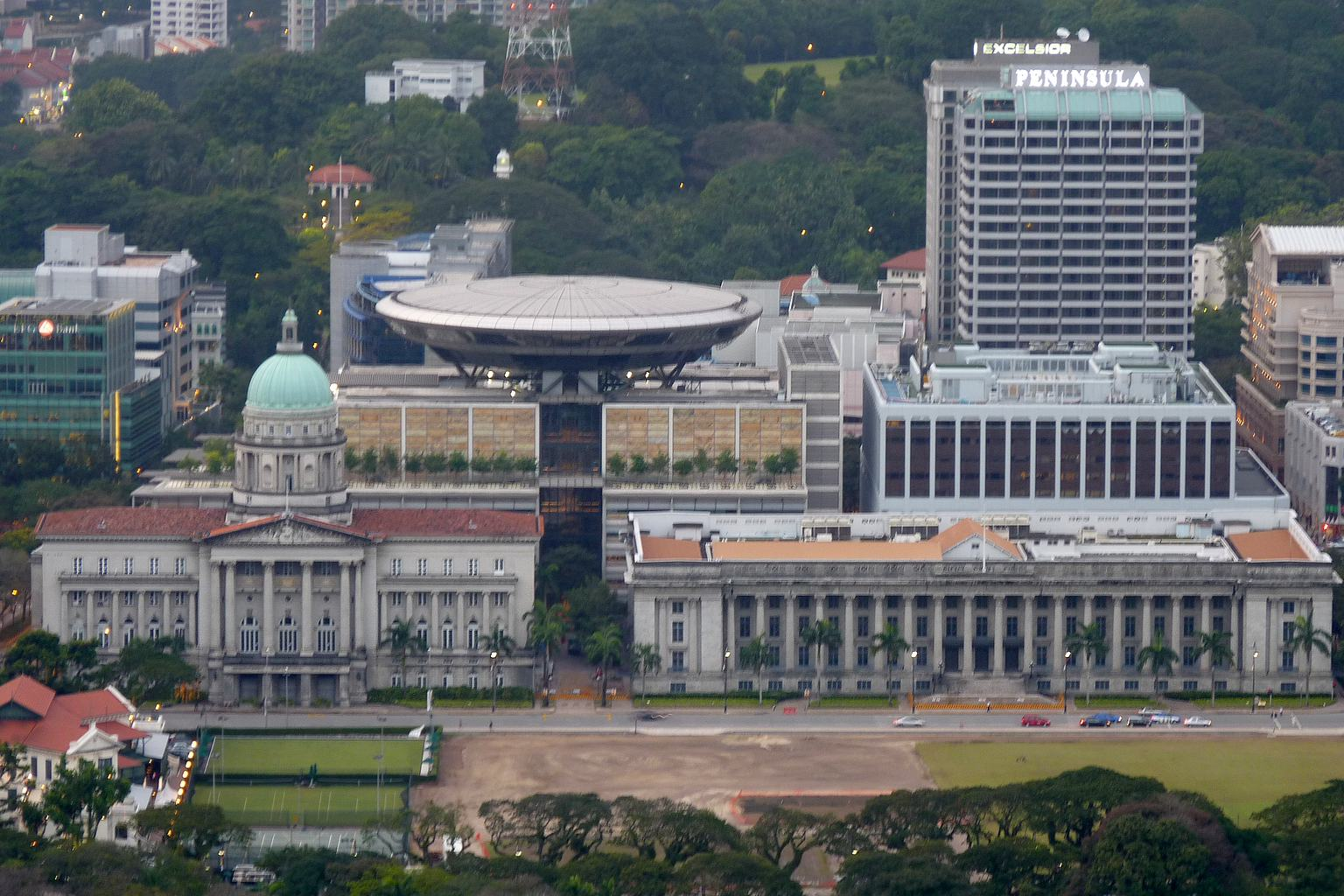
An aerial view of the Old Supreme Court Building (foreground left), the present Supreme Court Building (middle), and City Hall Building (foreground right)

Singapore gained independence from the United Kingdom through merger with Malaysia in 1963. The judicial power of Malaysia was vested in a Federal Court, a High Court in Malaya, a High Court in Borneo (now the High Court in Sabah and Sarawak), and a High Court in Singapore (which replaced the Supreme Court of the Colony of Singapore). Appeals lay from the High Court in Singapore to the Federal Court in Kuala Lumpur, and then to the Privy Council. The merger did not last: in 1965 Singapore left the Federation of Malaysia and became an independent republic. However, the High Court remained part of the Federal Court structure until 1969, when Singapore enacted the Supreme Court of Judicature Act to regularise the judicial system. Coming into force on 9 January 1970, the Act declared that the Supreme Court of Singapore now consisted of the Court of Appeal, the Court of Criminal Appeal and the High Court. The Judicial Committee of the Privy Council remained Singapore's highest appellate court until a permanent Court of Appeal for both civil and criminal appeals was established. Appeals to the Privy Council were completely abolished in 1994.

The first woman to serve as a supreme court justice is Lai Siu Chiu, who was sworn in on 30 April 1994.

== Constitution of the Court ==
Article 93 of the Constitution of the Republic of Singapore vests the judicial power of Singapore in the Supreme Court and the Subordinate Courts. The Chief Justice is the head of the judiciary.

The Supreme Court is a superior court of record. It is superior in the sense that its jurisdiction to hear civil and criminal cases is unlimited compared to the Subordinate Courts, and it hears appeals from these courts. As a court of record, it keeps a perpetual record of its proceedings. The Court of Appeal is the upper division of the Supreme Court, the lower one being the High Court.

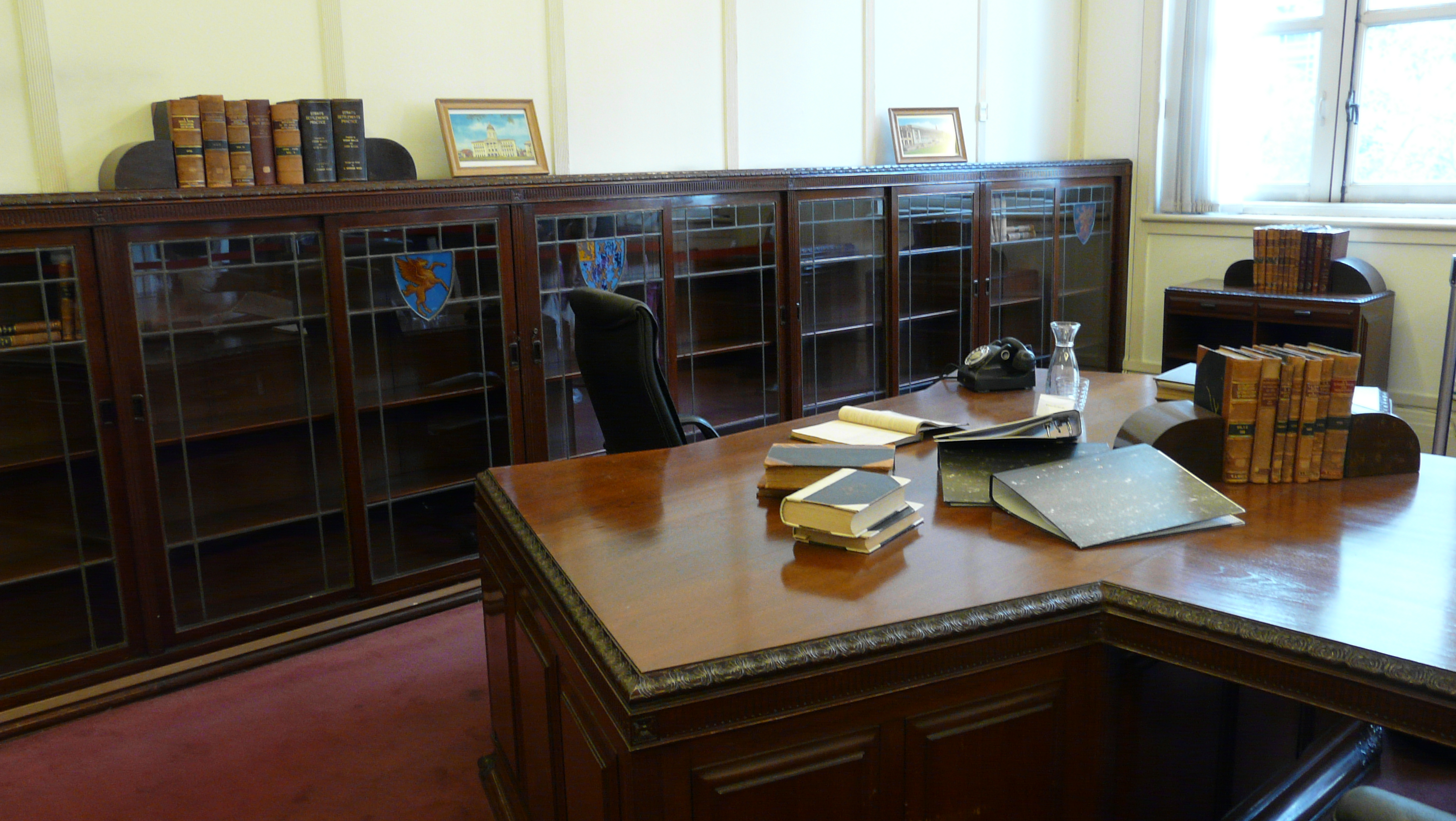
The Chief Justice's chambers in the Old Supreme Court Building

The Supreme Court Bench consists of the Chief Justice, the Judges of Appeal, and Judges and Judicial Commissioners of the High Court. All members of the Bench are appointed by the President of Singapore if he, acting in his discretion, concurs with the advice of the Prime Minister. Before Judges of Appeal, High Court Judges and Judicial Commissioners are appointed, the Prime Minister must also consult the Chief Justice before tendering advice on the matter to the President. A judge, for at least ten years, must meet the qualifications of the Legal Profession Act before being appointed. or a member of the Singapore Legal Service, or both.

The Court of Appeal is made up of the Chief Justice, who is the President of the Court, and the Judges of Appeal. The Chief Justice may ask High Court judges to sit as judges of the Court of Appeal to hear specific appeals. Pursuant to the Chief Justice's power to appoint Judges of Appeal as vice-presidents of the Court, Justice of Appeal Chao Hick Tin has been vice-president of the Court since 18 April 2008. The High Court consists of the Chief Justice and the Judges of the High Court, together with Judicial Commissioners who have the same powers and immunities as High Court Judges.

When hearing an appeal, the Court of Appeal normally sits with a bench of three Judges of Appeal, one of whom is the Chief Justice. If necessary though, such as in cases of unusual difficulty or importance, the bench may comprise five or any greater uneven number of judges. Certain appeals, including those against interlocutory orders, may be heard by only two judges. Matters before the Court are decided according to the opinion of the majority of the members of the Court hearing the case. If there are only two judges hearing an appeal and they disagree, the appeal is dismissed and the decision appealed against stands. Proceedings in the High Court are heard before a single judge, unless otherwise provided by any written law. A Judge of Appeal may also sit in the High Court as a Judge.

As of May 2022, the Supreme Court comprise 28 judges - including the chief justice and four judges of appeal - three senior judges and 17 international judges.

== Administration ==
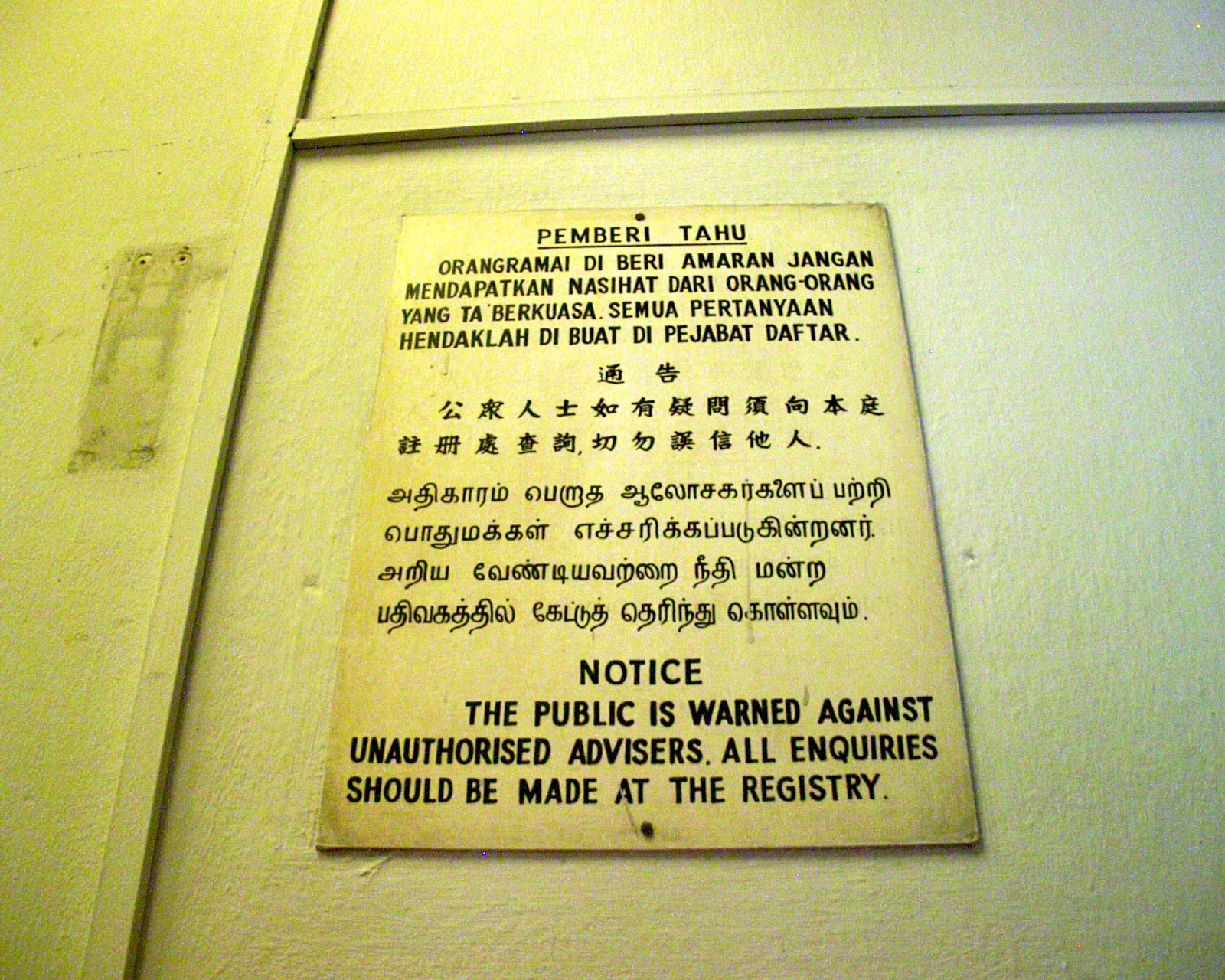
A sign at the Old Supreme Court Building advising members of the public to make enquiries at the Supreme Court Registry rather than from unauthorised persons

Administration of the Supreme Court is managed by its registry, which handles matters such as receiving and storing court documents filed in the court, and ensuring they are transmitted to judges for use during hearings. The Registry is headed by the Registrar who is assisted by the Deputy Registrar, Senior Assistant Registrars and Assistant Registrars. These officers are appointed by the President on the Chief Justice's recommendation, and are members of the Singapore Judicial Service. Registrars deal with certain types of court proceedings in chambers, such as the assessment of damages, hearings of bankruptcy petitions and applications, interlocutory matters and pre-trial conferences. Registrars are also appointed as district judges or magistrates, which enables them to conduct preliminary inquiries to determine whether there are enough grounds for trying accused persons for criminal offences in the High Court. The Registry is also staffed by commissioners for oaths, interpreters, clerks and process servers. Justices' law clerks, who work directly under the Chief Justice's charge, assist Judges and Judicial Commissioners with legal research, particularly for Court of Appeal matters.

A Chief Executive of Judiciary Administration and Operations position was established on 1 February 2013. The Chief Executive's main responsibilities include overseeing the administration and operations of the Supreme Court. Court Administrators assist the Chief Executive in carrying out these duties.

== Calendar ==
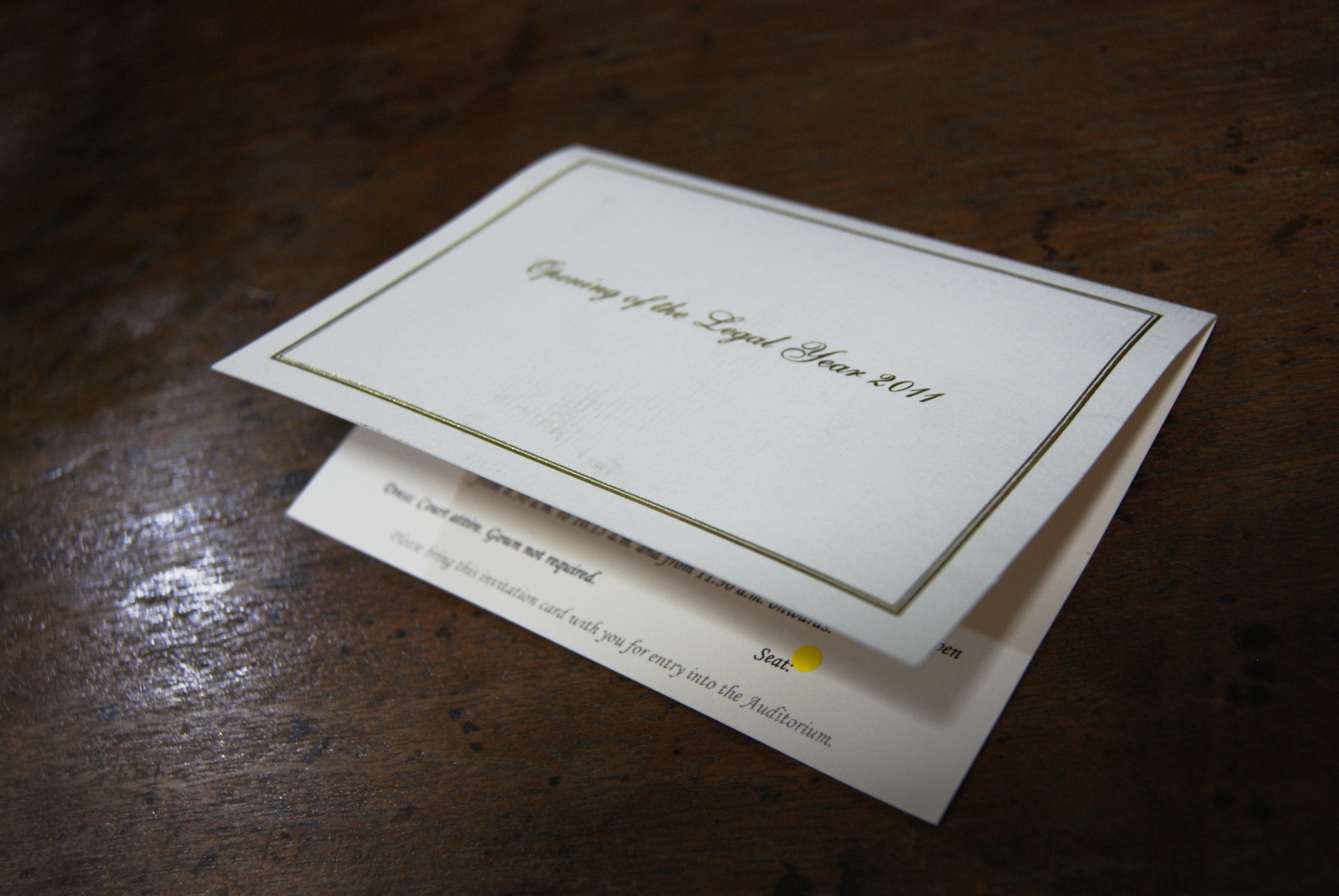
An invitation card for the Opening of the Legal Year 2011, which was held on 7 January 2011

The Chief Justice is empowered to determine the sitting times of the High Court and the Court of Appeal and the distribution of business among judges, and to schedule vacations of the Supreme Court not exceeding two months in each calendar year. In general, the High Court and Court of Appeal sits throughout the year except during the mid-year and end-year court vacations (usually end of May to end of June, and the beginning of December to the beginning of January respectively).

The opening of each legal year is marked with a ceremony usually held on the first Saturday of January, though in 2011 it took place on the first Friday. In form it is a court hearing, though lawyers are not required to dress in court robes. During the ceremony, the Attorney-General and the President of the Law Society of Singapore deliver speeches. The Chief Justice then responds with his own speech, and also announces the names of advocates and solicitors appointed as Senior Counsel. The speeches generally summarise legal developments over the past year and look forward to the future, and the Attorney-General and Law Society President traditionally pledge that legal officers and legal practitioners will continue to support the judiciary and co-operate with each other.

The Opening of the Legal Year ceremony can be traced back to the ceremonial opening of the first assizes of the year which was held in the 19th century when Singapore was managed by the East India Company. The assizes were periodic criminal courts held in Singapore. The ceremony ceased for some years but was revived in 1923. In that year the ceremony involved the Chief Justice inspecting a Sikh guard of honour commanded by a subedar outside the Supreme Court, then being met by the Registrar, Deputy Registrar and Sheriff. The four gentlemen made their way to the Chief Justice's chambers in the courthouse, the route lined by police officers and members of the Bar. By 1926, the practice of attending a service at St. Andrew's Cathedral prior to the honour guard inspection had been revived, and in 1955 it was reported that a service was also held at the Cathedral of the Good Shepherd for Roman Catholic judges and lawyers. Church services ceased to be an official part of the ceremony when Singapore joined the Federation of Malaysia in 1963, though members of the legal profession continued to attend special services in an unofficial capacity. Following Singapore's full independence in 1965, the ceremony became known as the Opening of the Legal Year. The ceremony was generally held on the first Monday in January following the end-of-year court vacation, but in 1971 for the first time it was held on the first Saturday in January to coincide with the inaugural Commonwealth Heads of Government Meeting in Singapore. This set the trend for subsequent years. It appears that the parade by police officers during which Chief Justice inspected a guard of honour was abolished in the late 1960s or early 1970s.

== Jurisdiction and powers ==
=== Jurisdiction ===
==== Court of Appeal ====
The Court of Appeal exercises only appellate jurisdiction in civil and criminal matters. In other words, it possesses no original jurisdiction – it does not deal with trials of matters coming before the court for the first time. In general, the Court hears civil appeals from decisions of the High Court made in the exercise of the latter's original and appellate jurisdiction, that is, decisions on cases that started in the High Court as well as decisions that were appealed from the Subordinate Courts to the High Court. However, this rule is subject to various restrictions. Some types of High Court decisions are not appealable to the Court of Appeal, while others are only appealable if the Court grants leave (permission).

Where criminal matters are concerned, the Court only hears appeals from cases originating in the High Court. Matters heard by the High Court on appeal from the Subordinate Courts cannot be further appealed to the Court of Appeal, though questions of law may be submitted to the Court for determination. During a Subordinate Court trial, instead of applying for the trial judge to state a case for the High Court's opinion, a party to the proceedings may apply to the Court of Appeal for leave for a case to be stated directly to that Court.

==== High Court ====
The High Court hears both criminal and civil cases as a court of first instance – it can deal with trials of matters coming before the courts for the first time. A special aspect of the Court's original jurisdiction is its judicial review jurisdiction. The Court exercises two types of judicial review: judicial review under the Constitution of Singapore, and judicial review of administrative acts.

With a few limited exceptions, the High Court has the jurisdiction to hear and try any action in personam (that is, directed towards a particular person) where the defendant is served with a writ of summons or other originating process in or outside Singapore, or where the defendant submits to the Court's jurisdiction. In theory, the Court has unlimited original jurisdiction – it can hear any type of case no matter how trivial or serious. In practice, though, parties may be penalised by having to pay higher costs (legal fees) if they choose to bring a civil case before the High Court when it is more appropriately dealt with by a subordinate court. Generally, except in probate matters, a civil case must be commenced in the High Court if the value of the claim exceeds S$250,000. Probate matters are commenced in the High Court only if the value of the deceased's estate exceeds $3 million, or if the case involves the resealing of a foreign grant of probate or letters of administration.

Admiralty matters, bankruptcy proceedings and company winding-up proceedings are exclusively heard by the High Court. The Court also exercises jurisdiction relating to divorce and matrimonial matters; and to appoint and control the legal guardians of infants (minors) and mentally disordered persons, and make orders concerning their persons and property. However, matrimonial and guardianship proceedings have been transferred to the District Court, except for contested applications for the division of matrimonial assets worth $1.5 million or more which are still heard in the High Court. Proceedings under the Mental Capacity Act begun in the High Court on or after 1 March 2010 are also dealt with by district courts.

The High Court has jurisdiction to try all offences committed in Singapore and may also try offences committed outside Singapore in certain circumstances. In criminal cases, the High Court generally tries cases where the offences are punishable with death or imprisonment for a term which exceeds ten years. The High Court also hears appeals from the decisions of District Courts and Magistrates' Courts in civil and criminal cases, and decides points of law reserved in special cases submitted by a District Court or a Magistrate's Court. In addition, the High Court has general supervisory and revisionary jurisdiction over all subordinate courts in any civil or criminal matter.

=== Powers ===
==== General ====
The High Court exercises powers that are vested in it by written law. It may, for instance, order that evidence be preserved by seizure, detention, inspection, photographing, the taking of samples, the conduct of experiments or in any manner, both before and after proceedings are commenced; transfer any proceedings to any other court, or to or from any subordinate court; and order the medical examination of a person who is a party to any proceedings where his or her physical or mental condition is relevant to any matter in question in the proceedings. When hearing an appeal, the Court of Appeal possesses all the powers and duties of the High Court, and has "full power to determine any question necessary to be determined for the purpose of doing justice in any case before the Court".

The High Court has power to prohibit vexatious litigants from bringing or continuing legal proceedings without its permission. The Attorney-General must apply to the Court for such an order, and the Court must be satisfied that the person has "habitually and persistently and without any reasonable ground instituted vexatious legal proceedings, in any court or subordinate court, whether against the same person or against different persons".

==== Regulation of lawyers ====
All advocates and solicitors admitted to the bar and all officers of the Singapore Legal Service are officers of the Supreme Court. The Court therefore plays important roles in the admission of lawyers to the bar and their professional discipline.

Persons seeking to become advocates and solicitors must apply to the Supreme Court. An advocate is a lawyer who appears in court on behalf of his or her client, while solicitors traditionally deal with non-contentious legal matters that do not require court appearances. As the legal profession in Singapore is fused, applicants are admitted to the bar as both advocates and solicitors, and may practise as either or both. Admission is in the discretion of the Court and subject to the requirements specified in the Legal Profession Act. The Act specifically provides that no person is disqualified by sex from being admitted and enrolled as an advocate and solicitor. Unless the Chief Justice orders otherwise, applications for admission as an advocate and solicitor are heard on the second Wednesday of each month except during court vacations. The Court generally arranges a "mass call" of advocates and solicitors on the last Saturday of May to cater to the large number of graduates from the Faculty of Law of the National University of Singapore and the School of Law of the Singapore Management University completing their professional training and seeking admission to the bar at this time of year. Where a case is difficult and complex, the Court may admit on an ad hoc basis a Queen's Counsel who does not ordinarily reside in Singapore or Malaysia and who has special qualifications or experience to practise as an advocate and solicitor for the purpose of the case. Lawyers practising as advocates and solicitors, other than Queen's Counsel admitted ad hoc, are required to apply annually to the Registrar of the Supreme Court for a practising certificate.

Complaints about the conduct of advocates and solicitors may be referred by the Council of the Law Society of Singapore to an inquiry panel appointed by the Chief Justice. The inquiry panel investigates the complaint and reports on the matter to the council. The council, on considering the report, may decide that no formal investigation is necessary, impose a penalty on the lawyer concerned, or apply to the Chief Justice for a disciplinary tribunal to be appointed to formally investigate the complaint. If a disciplinary tribunal is convened, it hears and investigates the matter and decides whether any disciplinary action against the lawyer is warranted. If not, it may dismiss the matter or impose a penalty appropriate to the misconduct. However, if it determines that disciplinary action is necessary, the Law Society must apply to the Supreme Court for the matter to be heard by a Court of Three Judges, which has power to order that a lawyer be struck off the roll of advocates and solicitors, suspended from practice for not more than five years, fined up to $100,000, or censured.

== Judicial precedent ==
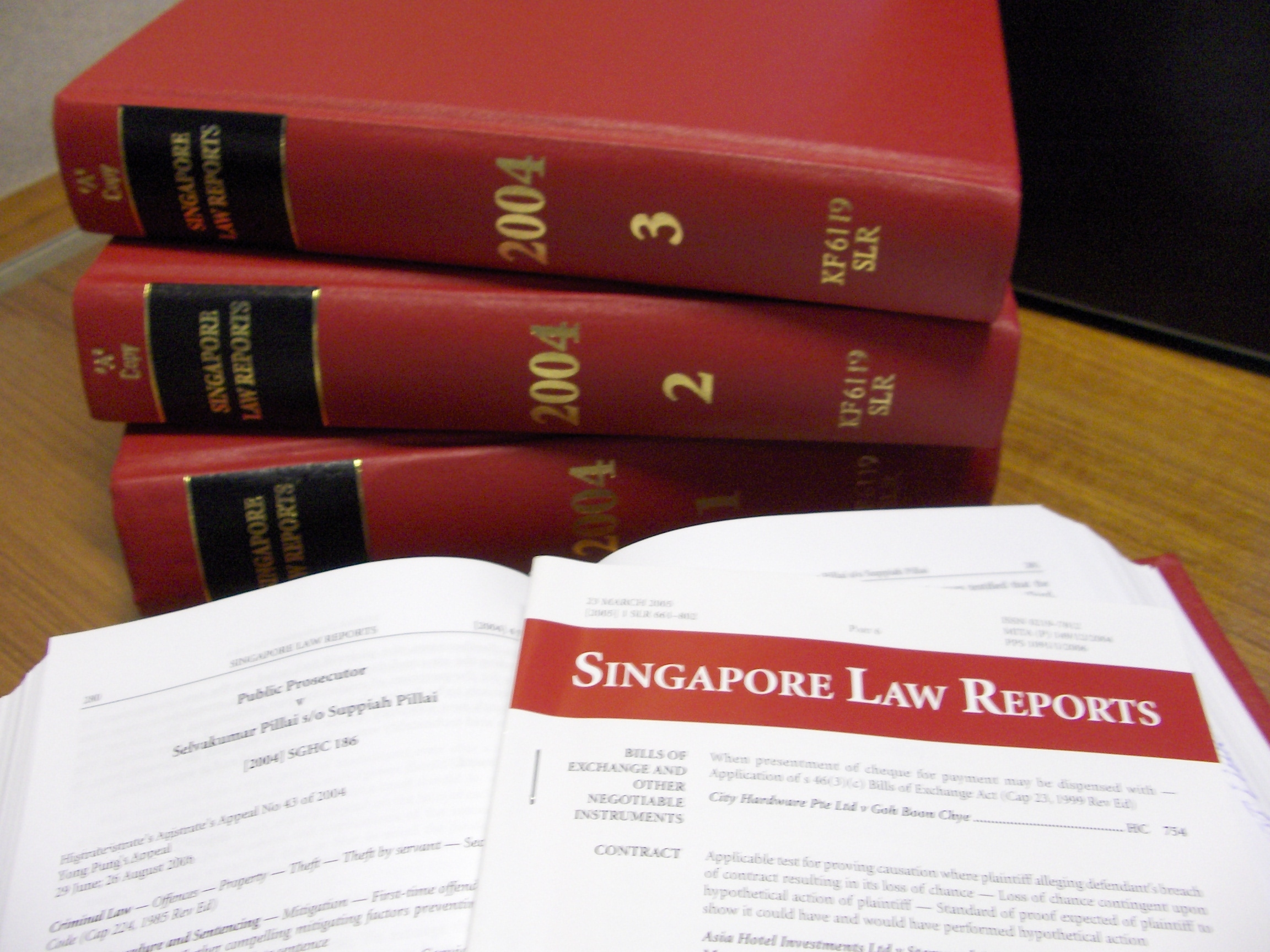
Copies of the Singapore Law Reports, Singapore's official series of law reports containing judgments of the Constitution of the Republic of Singapore Tribunal, Court of Appeal and High Court

As the highest court of Singapore and its final appellate court, under the principles of stare decisis (judicial precedent) decisions of the Court of Appeal are binding on the High Court and Subordinate Courts. Even if judges in these courts disagree with the reasoning given by the Court of Appeal in particular cases, they are required to apply the legal principles laid down in those cases.

The Court of Appeal became Singapore's final appellate court following the abolition of all appeals to the Privy Council with effect from 8 April 1994. On 11 July that year, the Court handed down a practice statement declaring that it would regard itself free to depart from previous decisions of its own or of the Privy Council

in any case where adherence to such prior decisions would cause injustice in a particular case or constrain the development of the law in conformity with the circumstances of Singapore. Therefore, whilst this court will continue to treat such prior decisions as normally binding, this court will, whenever it appears right to do so, depart from such prior decisions. Bearing in mind the danger of retrospectively disturbing contractual, proprietary and other legal rights, this power will be exercised sparingly.

The Court justified this new principle on the basis that "the political, social and economic circumstances of Singapore have changed enormously since Singapore became an independent and sovereign republic. The development of our law should reflect these changes and the fundamental values of Singapore society."

Decisions of the High Court are binding on District Courts and Magistrates' Courts. However, a judge of the High Court is not bound by previous decisions by other High Court judges. As a matter of comity, though, a High Court judge will generally not depart from a previous decision unless there is a good reason to do so, particularly if that decision has stood for some time. If there are conflicting High Court decisions, it is up to the Court of Appeal to decide which decision is correct.

Where the President has referred to the Constitution of the Republic of Singapore Tribunal a question concerning the Constitution's effect on a bill, no court – including the Court of Appeal – may subsequently question the Tribunal's opinion on the bill or, assuming the bill is found to be constitutional, the validity of any law based on the bill.

== Court dress ==
=== Wigs ===
Up to the early 20th century wigs were not consistently worn in court by judges in Singapore, apparently due to the hot climate – in a letter of 13 February 1934 to The Straits Times the writer said that when he first arrived in Malaya seven years earlier he had been "astonished" to discover that judges and barristers did not don wigs, which he felt were "an important or necessary part of Court attire". Full-bottomed (long) horsehair wigs were, however, worn on ceremonial occasions such as the opening of the assizes. Two judges were notable for habitually wearing wigs: Justice Earnshaw, who wore a full-bottomed one; and Walter Sidney Shaw, Chief Justice between 1921 and 1925, who wore a short bob-wig. Upon his retirement, Shaw C.J. said that he had introduced the custom of wearing his wig in court

not because I have any desire to attire myself in fancy costume, or because I wished to give myself any special personal importance, but because I think that it tends to remind, not only the public and the Bar, but even the judge himself, that he is a representative of that very illustrious body of men – the English judges, who have done so much to establish and maintain the freedom of the English people.

From January 1934, judges began consistently wearing wigs in court, and most lawyers followed suit. There was, however, occasional criticism of the practice. The wearing of short wigs by lawyers was optional, and tended to be favoured by more senior lawyers.

At the Opening of the Legal Year on 5 January 1991, the Chief Justice Yong Pung How announced that the Council of Judges had unanimously decided that the short wig would cease to be part of court dress for all judges and lawyers, including Queen's Counsel appearing in Singapore courts. However, judges would continue to wear full-bottomed wigs on ceremonial occasions. Two years later in 1993 the latter practice was itself done away with, the Chief Justice commenting that the judges' ceremonial red robes and full-bottomed wigs were "now considered by many to be inappropriate as court dress for Judges and Judicial Commissioners in an independent sovereign Singapore. These have in fact been the butt of more and more derisory comment."

=== Robes ===
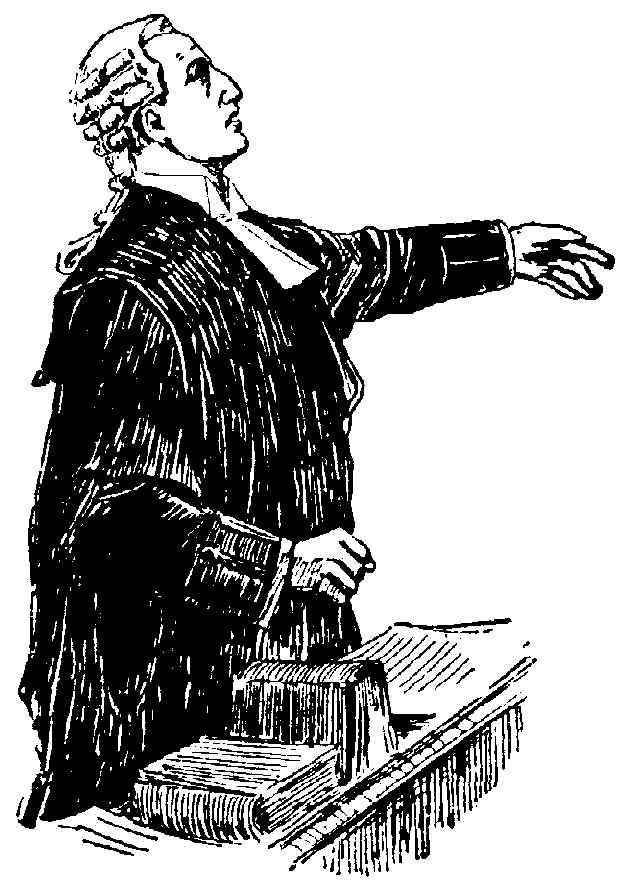
A 19th-century drawing of an English barrister wearing a black robe with a wing-collared shirt and bands, and a bob-wig

In colonial times, a judge in Singapore dressed in a manner similar to some of his counterparts in the United Kingdom. He wore a long scarlet robe with a grey cape or mantle and a black scarf around his shoulders, a white wing-collared shirt, and bands (a linen collar made of two rectangular pieces tied at the throat). Subsequently, the ordinary and ceremonial dress worn by judges was adapted from two of the various forms of court dress of English courts. On 9 January 1993, at the Opening of the Legal Year, the Chief Justice announced that judges would henceforth wear a lightweight black robe over an ordinary white shirt with a turn-down collar and a tie. The difficulty of obtaining shirts with wing collars and the growing sense that the traditional gown was inappropriate for the judiciary of an independent republic were cited as reasons for this change. On ceremonial occasions such as the Opening of the Legal Year, Supreme Court judges wear red robes with a black strip around the collar and extending down the front of the robe. The black strip on the Chief Justice's robe is edged with gold.

Formerly, a lawyer appearing in open court would wear a dark suit, a shirt with a wing collar, bands, and an English barrister's black robe. Women lawyers were required to wear skirts. With effect from 1993, the need for bands and wing-collared shirts was done away with. In open court, male lawyers are required to dress in "the existing gown worn over an ordinary long-sleeved white shirt with a turn-down collar, a tie of a subdued or sober colour, a dark jacket, dark trousers and black or plain coloured shoes". The instructions for the attire of female lawyers is similar, except that they must wear "a long-sleeved white blouse high to the neck" and must avoid "[c]onspicuous jewellery or ornaments". They may either wear a skirt or trousers. Gowns need not be worn when appearing before judges and registrars in chambers. Senior counsel may wear "a gown in the design of those worn by Queen's Counsel of England and Wales" made of silk, a silk and wool mix, or artificial silk.

== Supreme Court Building ==
The first courthouse in Singapore was the building known previously as Maxwell House and today as the Arts House at the Old Parliament. It was built in 1827 as a residence for a merchant named John Argyle Maxwell, but he opted to rent it to the colonial government for a rent of 500 Indian rupees a month for 15 years. A central room on the upper floor facing High Street was used by the Court of Judicature of Prince of Wales' Island, Singapore, and Malacca, while other rooms were used as government offices. In 1839, the court moved to a newly built one-storey annexe adjacent to Maxwell House so that the latter could be used entirely by the colonial government. Maxwell eventually sold the building to Sir George Bonham, Governor of the Straits Settlements, and the East India Company on 10 October 1842 for 15,600 Spanish dollars. However, the Maxwell House annexe proved to be unsuitable as a courthouse due to noise from a nearby shipbuilding yard. A new courthouse by the Singapore River was built in 1865. This building now forms the central core of the Empress Place Building which is occupied by the Asian Civilisations Museum. The courthouse was occupied by the court till 1875, when it moved into a new extension wing of Maxwell House. Maxwell House was eventually taken over by the legislature in 1954.

Construction on a new courthouse, now called the Old Supreme Court Building, began in 1937 on the site of the Grand Hotel de L'Europe on Saint Andrew's Road opposite the Padang. On 1 April 1937 the building's foundation stone – then the largest in Malaya – was laid by the Governor, Sir Shenton Thomas. Beneath the stone were placed six Singapore newspapers dated 31 March 1937 and some Straits Settlements coins; this time capsule is due to be retrieved in the year 3000. The Supreme Court Building was declared open by the Governor on 3 August 1939 and handed over to the Chief Justice Sir Percy McElwaine. Originally, the courthouse had four courts; another seven were added over the years. As this proved insufficient because of the Supreme Court's burgeoning caseload, at Chief Justice Wee Chong Jin's direction six additional courtrooms were constructed in the City Hall Building next door in 1986, and another six in 1988.

The present Supreme Court Building at 1 Supreme Court Lane (formerly Colombo Court) behind the old building was constructed between 2002 and 2005. Occupying 72,000 square metres (780,000 sq ft), it was designed by British architectural firm Foster and Partners and local architectural consultants CPG Corporation. The building is clad in translucent sheets of Portuguese rosa aurora marble. The liberal use of glass in atria, skylights and lift shafts, and the open layout of the building, are said to signify the ideal of transparency in the law. Operations in the building started on 20 June 2005, the first hearings took place on 27 June, and the building was officially opened by President S. R. Nathan at the Opening of the Legal Year ceremony on 7 January 2006. There are 12 civil courts, eight criminal courts and three appellate courts. High Court hearings take place in courtrooms on the second through sixth storeys, while the Court of Appeal is on the ninth storey, the highest level, in a disc-shaped structure that is a modern interpretation of the Old Supreme Court Building's dome and is intended to represent the impartiality of justice.

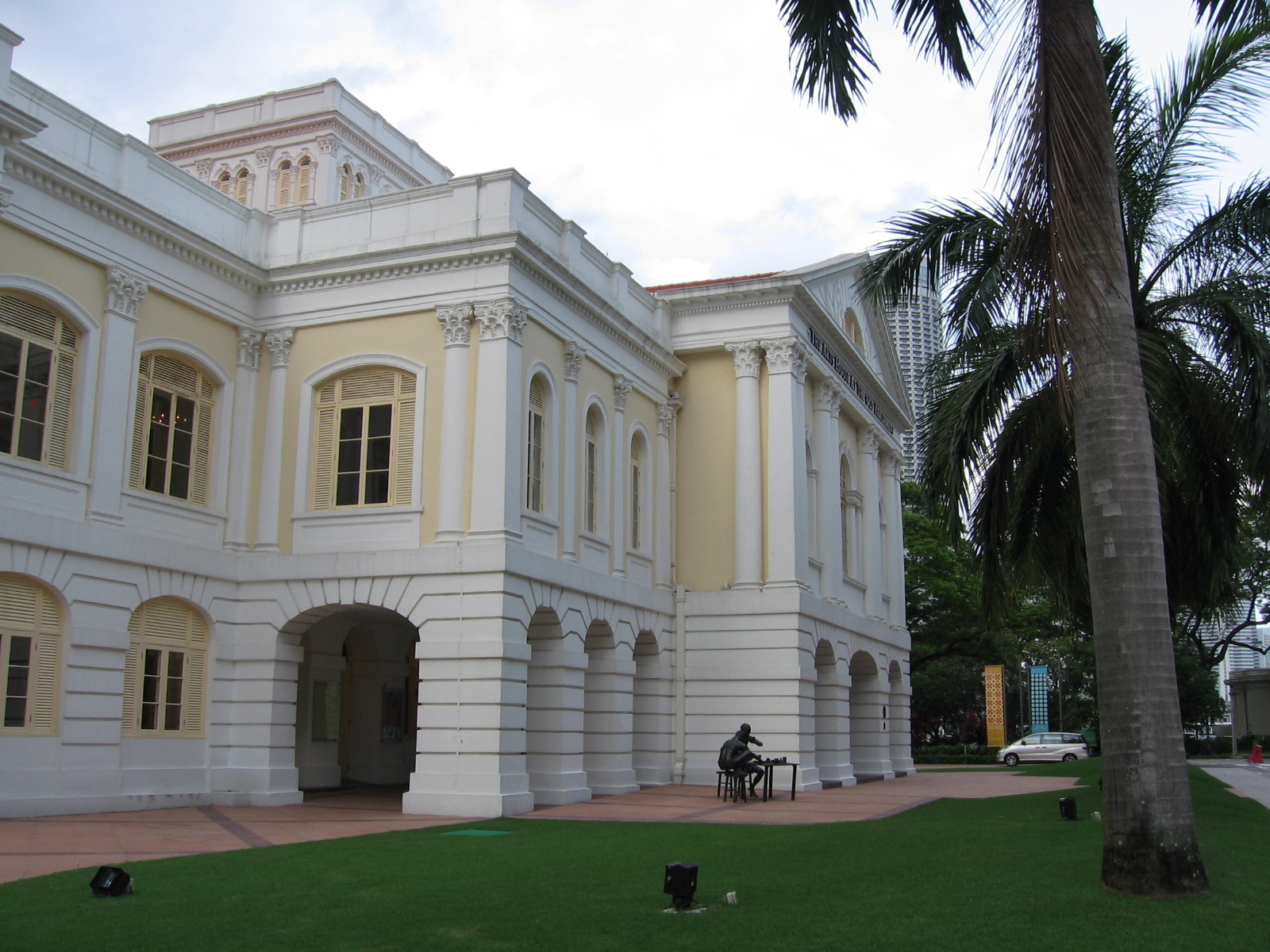
Maxwell House, now known as the Arts House at the Old Parliament, which was used as a courthouse from 1827 to 1865, and from 1875 to 1939

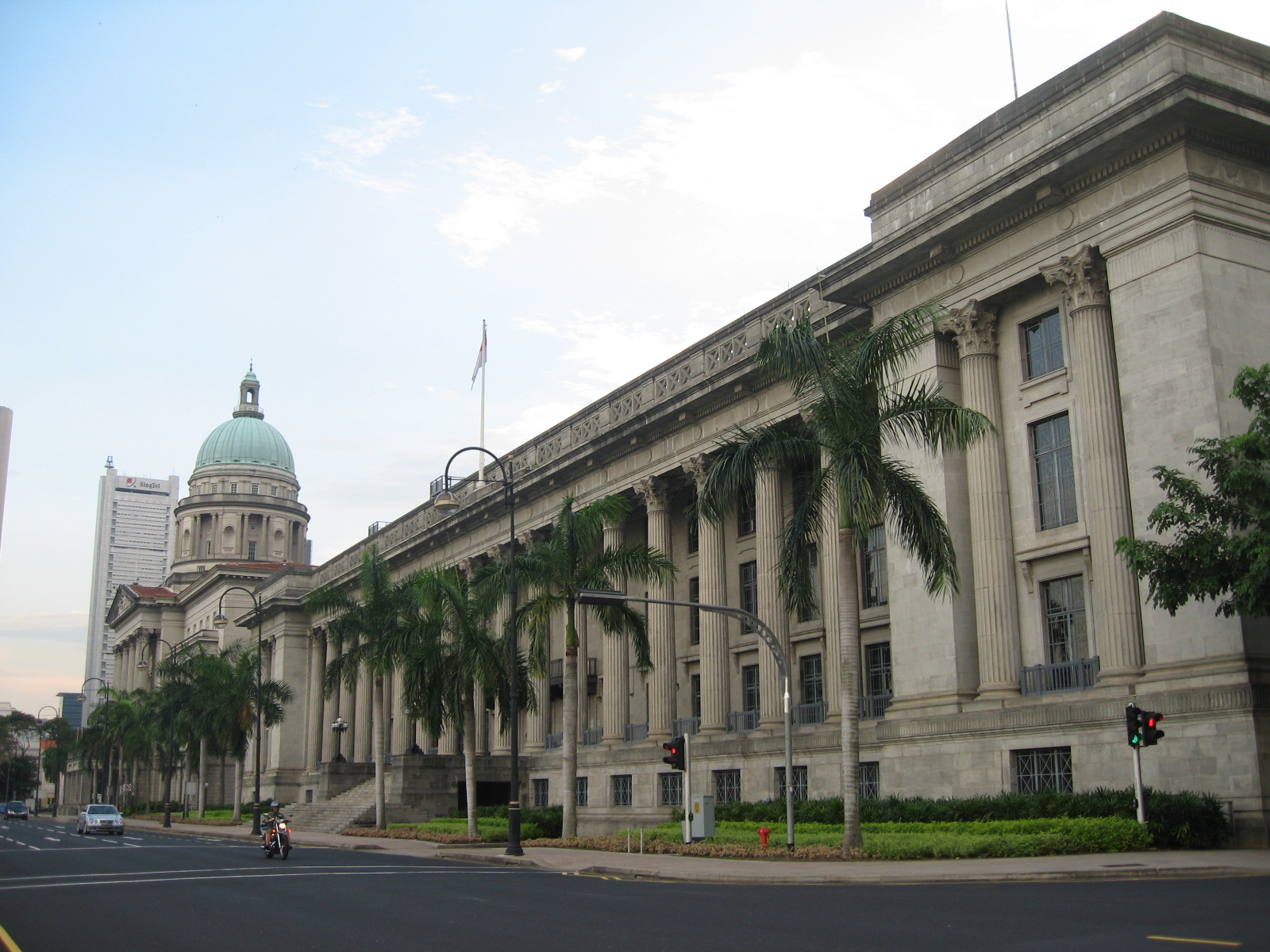
The Old Supreme Court Building (domed) and City Hall Building, which housed the Supreme Court between 1939 and 2005

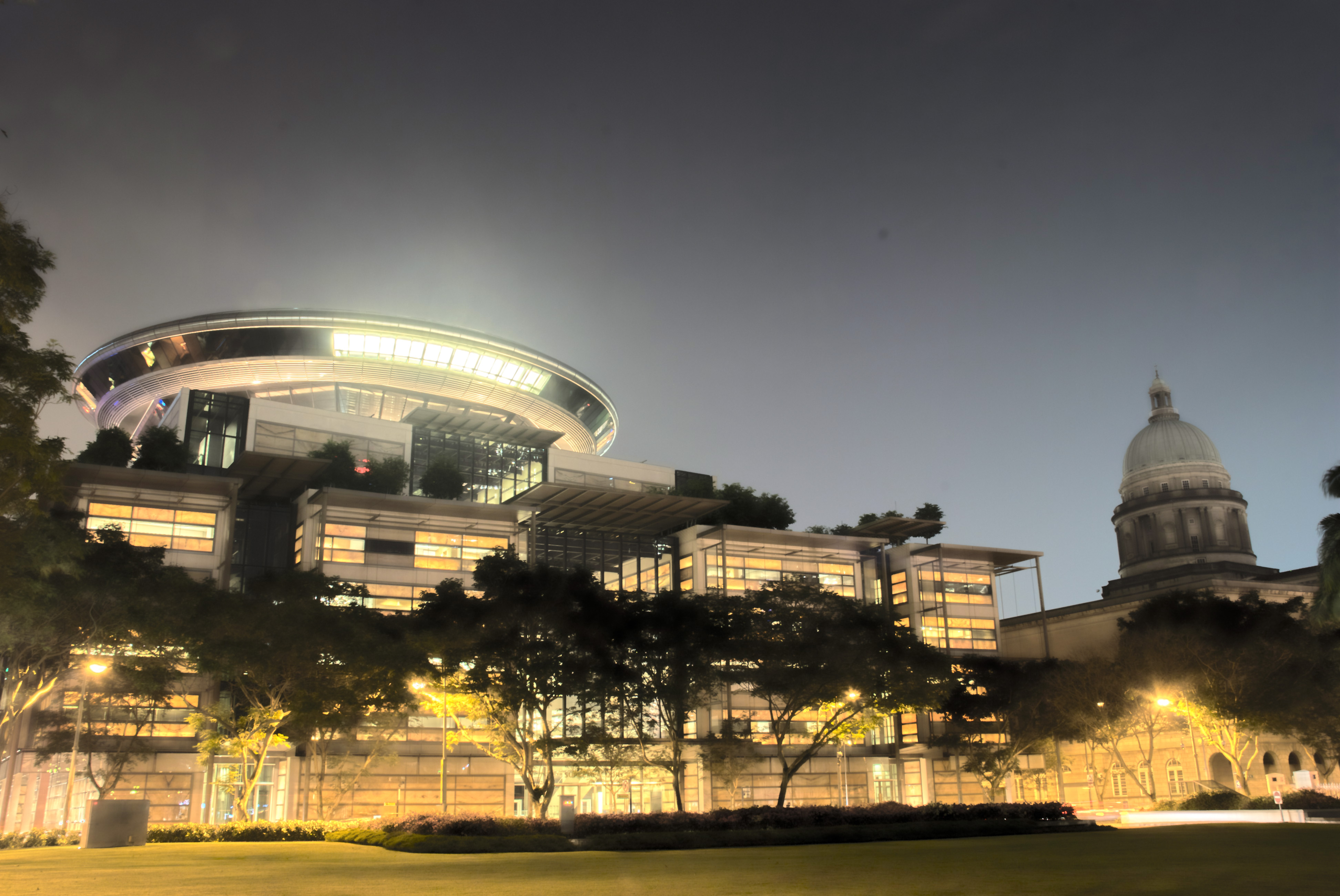
The new and old Supreme Court buildings at night

== See also ==
- Court of Appeal of Singapore
- Family Justice Courts
- High Court of Singapore
- Judicial independence in Singapore
- Judicial officers of the Republic of Singapore
- Judicial system of Singapore
- Law of Singapore
- Lawyers in Singapore
- Sources of Singapore law
- State Courts of Singapore
