= Rule of law in Singapore =

Law doctrine in Singapore

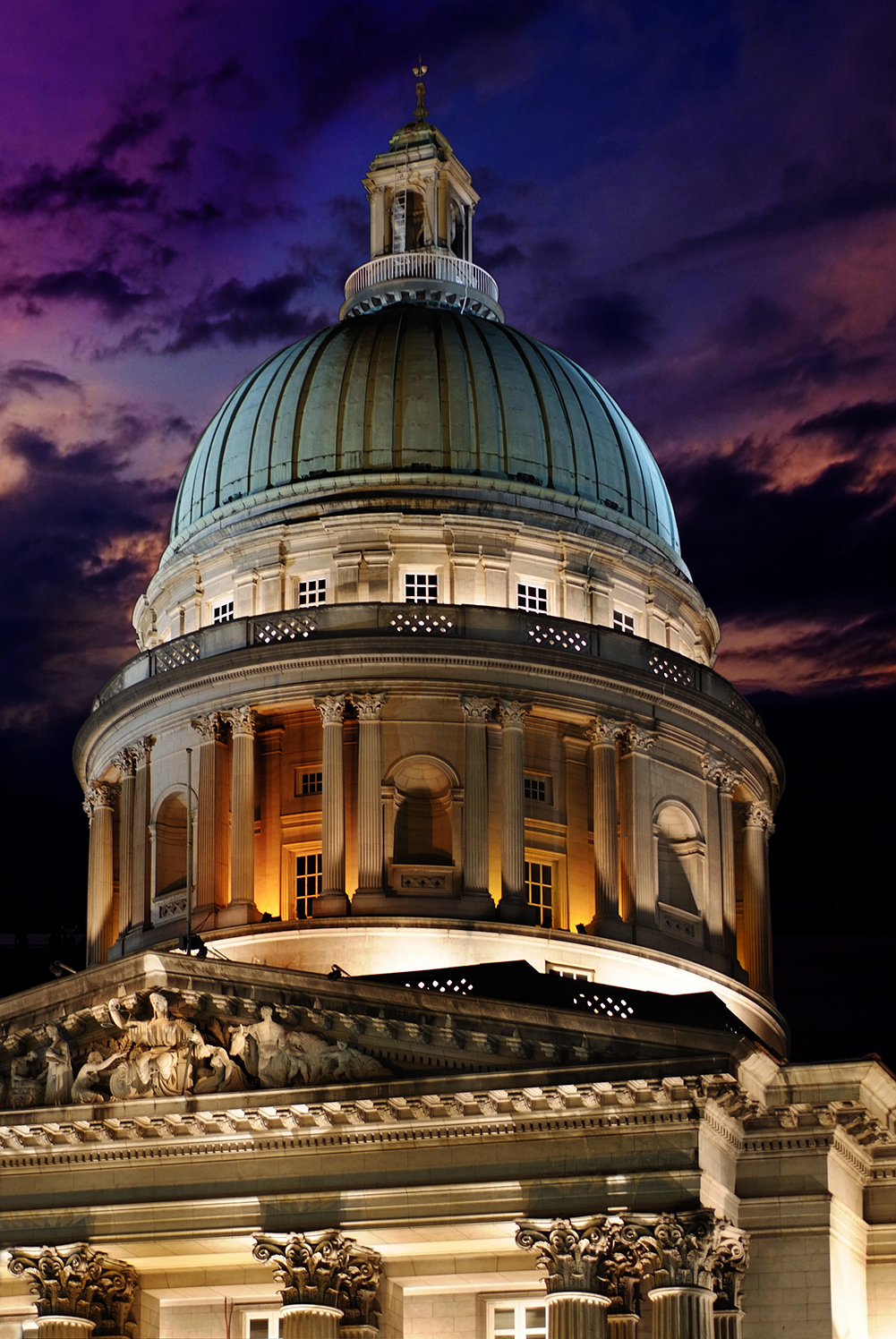
The dome of the Old Supreme Court Building. Judicial independence, the exercise of judicial review, and the accessibility of courts are widely seen as key elements of the rule of law.

The rule of law in Singapore has been the topic of considerable disagreement and debate, in particular, as a result of differing conceptions of the doctrine.

These conceptions of the rule of law can generally be divided into two categories: the "thin", or formal, conception; and the "thick", or substantive, conception. The thin conception, often associated with the legal scholars Albert Venn Dicey and Joseph Raz, advocates the view that the rule of law is fulfilled by adhering to formal procedures and requirements, such as the stipulations that all laws be prospective, clear, stable, constitutionally enacted, and that the parties to legal disputes are treated equally and without bias on the part of judges. While advocates of the thin conception do not dismiss the importance of the content of the law, they take the view that this is a matter of substantive justice and should not be regarded as part of the concept of the rule of law. On the other hand, the thick conception of the rule of law entails the notion that in addition to the requirements of the thin rule, it is necessary for the law to conform to certain substantive standards of justice and human rights.

A thin conception of the rule of law has generally been adopted by the Singapore Government and Members of Parliament from the ruling People's Action Party. However, a thicker conception was evinced by the Minister for Law in a speech made during the 2009 seasonal meeting of the New York State Bar Association's International Section in Singapore. On the other hand, a thick conception of the rule of law that encompasses human rights has been adopted by a number of Government critics, including opposition politicians, and foreign and international organizations such as Human Rights Watch, Lawyers' Rights Watch Canada, and the World Justice Project.

Some of the key principles associated with the thin conception of the rule of law include judicial independence, natural justice, the availability of judicial review, and the accessibility of justice. Judicial independence in Singapore is safeguarded by various constitutional provisions and legal rules, though some commentators have highlighted certain events as suggesting a lack of judicial independence. One incident in the 1980s involving the transfer of the Senior District Judge to the Attorney-General's Chambers following a decision he made which was favourable to an opposition politician. In Singapore, natural justice is generally regarded as a procedural rather than a substantive concept. The process of judicial review involves the review of executive actions for compliance with administrative law rules, and of executive and legislative acts for unconstitutionality in light of the doctrine of constitutional supremacy.

Advocates for the thick conception of the rule of law regard the Internal Security Act (Cap. 143, 1985 Rev. Ed.) ("ISA") as a breach of the rule of law. The Act, which provides for detention without trial for people regarded by the executive as a risk to national security, is shielded from unconstitutionality by Article 149 of the Constitution. Although the Court of Appeal held in the 1988 case Chng Suan Tze v. Minister for Home Affairs that the courts could review the legality of detentions under the Act, the effect of the case was reversed through amendments to the Constitution and the ISA in the following year. The ISA amendments were determined to be effective by the High Court and Court of Appeal in Teo Soh Lung v. Minister for Home Affairs. The Singapore Government justifies the statute as a crucial measure of last resort for preserving security.

== Conceptual framework ==
Attempts to define the rule of law can roughly be divided into two categories: the "thin", or formal, conception and the "thick", or substantive, conception of the rule of law.

=== Thin conception of the rule of law ===
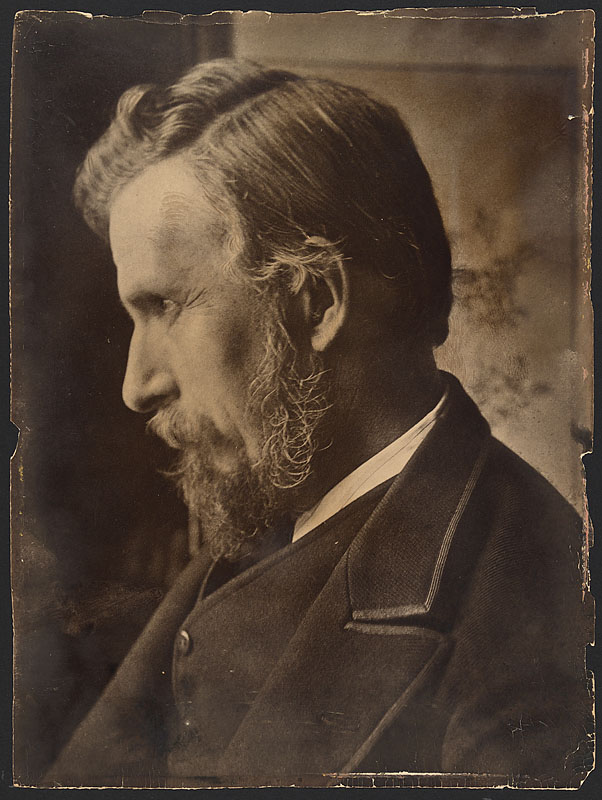
British constitutional theorist Albert Venn Dicey is often associated with the thin conception of the rule of law.

The "thin" conception rule of law advocates the view that the rule of law is fulfilled by adhering to formal procedures and requirements, and that the normative content of law concerns substantive legal issue separate from the rule of law.

According to Albert Venn Dicey, the rule of law in the United Kingdom has three dominant characteristics. First, the absolute supremacy of regular law – a person is to be judged by a fixed set of rules and punished for breaching only the law, and is not to be subject to "the exercise by persons in authority of wide, arbitrary, or discretionary powers of constraint". Second, the equality of law — "the universal subjection of all classes to one law administered by the ordinary Courts". Third, the fact that, in the United Kingdom, the constitution is the result of the common law, being not the source but the consequence of citizens' rights.

A 1977 article by Joseph Raz argued that the rule of law means that people should obey the law and be ruled by it. Construed more narrowly, the rule of law would also mean that the government should be ruled by and subjected to the law. Following from Raz's general conception of the rule of law, he argued for the existence of two groups of principles of the rule of law: First, that the law is capable of guiding the behaviour of its subjects; second, that there exists an effective legal machinery that secures actual compliance with the rule of law. The first group comprises principles such as the accessibility, clarity, and prospective nature of the law; the stability of the law; and the compliance of lawmaking with "open, stable, clear and general rules" that create a stable framework, with such rules empowering authorities to make orders and providing guidelines for the exercise of such powers. The second group includes principles including judicial independence, natural justice, judicial review, and limited administrative discretion.

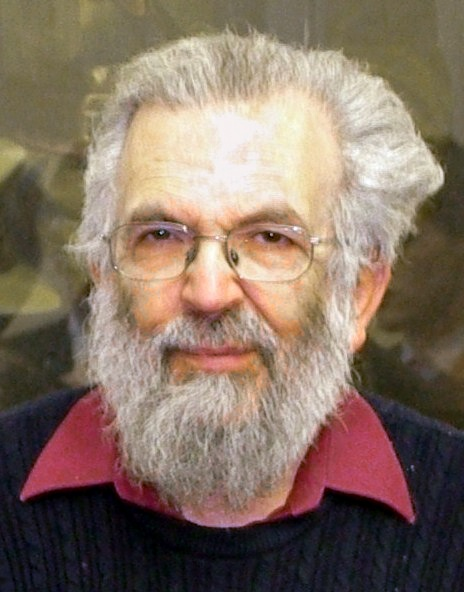
Joseph Raz in February 2009. He stated in a 1977 article that the rule of law requires that "the making of particular laws should be guided by open and relatively stable general rules".

In Raz's view, one of the virtues of the rule of law is the restraint it imposes on authorities. It aims to exclude arbitrary power as it is said that most of the exercises of arbitrary power violate the rule of law. Arbitrary power is excluded when courts hold themselves accountable only to the law and observe "fairly strict procedures". Another virtue is the protection it accords to individual freedom, namely, "the sense of freedom in which it is identified with an effective ability to choose between as many options as possible". Most importantly, to adhere to the rule of law is to respect human dignity by "treating humans as persons capable of planning and plotting their future".

Raz also identified some of the potential pitfalls of the rule of law. He opined that as the rule of law is designed "to minimise the harm to freedom and dignity which the law may cause in its pursuit of its goals however laudable these may be", the strict pursuit of the rule of law may prevent one from achieving certain social goals which may be preferable to the rule of law: "Sacrificing too many social goals on the altar of the rule of law may make the law barren and empty".

=== Thick conception of the rule of law ===
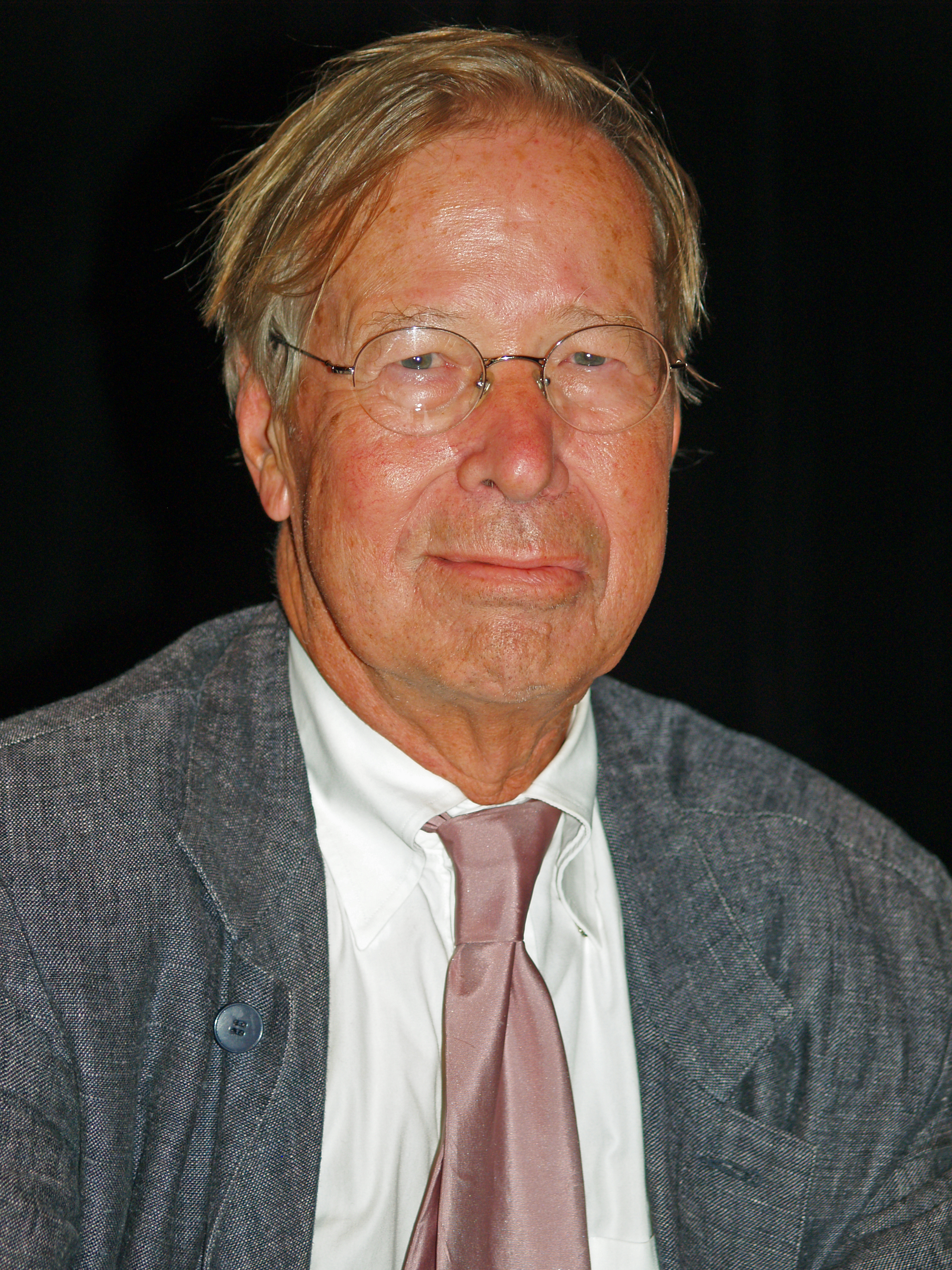
Ronald Dworkin in September 2008. Dworkin's conception of the rule of law is "thick", as it encompasses a substantive theory of law and adjudication.

The "thick" rule of law entails the notion that in addition to the requirements of the thin rule, it is necessary for the law to conform with certain substantive standards of justice and human rights. Ronald Dworkin, one of the leading scholars advocating the thick conception of the rule of law, defines what he terms the "rights conception" of the rule of law as follows:

It assumes that citizens have moral rights and duties with respect to one another, and political rights against the state as a whole. It insists that these moral and political rights be recognized in positive law, so that they may be enforced upon the demand of individual citizens through courts or other judicial institutions of the familiar type, so far as this is practicable. The rule of law on this conception is the ideal of rule by an accurate public conception of individual rights. It does not distinguish, as the rule book conception does, between the rule of law and substantive justice; on the contrary it requires, as part of the ideal of law, that the rules in the book capture and enforce moral rights.

Paul Craig, in analysing Dworkin's view, drew three conclusions. First, Dworkin rejects the need to distinguish between "legal" rules and a more complete political philosophy, since the rule of law is basically the theory of law and adjudication that he believes is correct. Secondly, the rule of law is not simply the thin or formal rule of law; the latter forms part of Dworkin's theory of law and adjudication. Thirdly, since taking a substantive view of the rule of law requires choosing what the best theory of justice is, it is necessary to articulate particular conceptions of what liberty, equality and other freedoms require.

== Conceptions of the rule of law taken in Singapore ==
=== Thin conception ===
On 24 November 1999, Non-constituency Member of Parliament Joshua Benjamin Jeyaretnam moved the following motion in Parliament: "That this House recognises the importance of the Rule of Law and urges the government to ensure the complete and full compliance of the Rule of Law by all Ministers, officials and public servants." During the ensuing debate, the Members of Parliament (MPs) from the ruling People's Action Party tended to adhere to a thinner, or more formal, conception of the rule of law. For instance, the Minister of State for Law Ho Peng Kee said:

In short, the Rule of Law refers to the supremacy of law, as opposed to the arbitrary exercise of power. The other key tenet is that everyone is equal before the law. The concept also includes the notions of the transparency, openness and prospective application of our laws, observation of the principles of natural justice, independence of the Judiciary and judicial review of administrative action.

Chin Tet Yung, an MP for Sembawang Group Representation Constituency, commented that the rule of law required that:

... [a]ll laws are prospective, stable, properly and constitutionally enacted. The application of laws, the making of legal orders by public officers should be guided by clear and general rules, that is, avoiding any personal bias or favour, treating equal cases equally, making decisions rationally and in the public interest, and in accordance with the written laws of the land. ... In this particular principle where you have laws, obviously such laws must be applied and obviously the laws are applied by public officers who make legal orders. If these legal orders are substantiated by subsidiary legislation, if this subsidiary legislation is sanctioned by parent Acts, by the primary legislation, then any order issuing from it would be legitimate and would comply with the Rule of Law. And, if anyone is unhappy with that, there is always the next aspect or principle of the Rule of Law, and that is, that the judiciary has the power and the authority to review any administrative action. So that is the third principle. The final principle ... is that the judiciary must be independent and the courts should be generally accessible to all who seek recourse to them.

Chin moved an amendment to the motion introduced by Jeyaretnam so that it read: "That this House (1) values the importance of the Rule of Law; and (2) commends the Government for upholding the Rule of Law and ensuring that it is fully observed by all." The amendment motion was eventually voted on and agreed to by a majority of MPs in Parliament.

In a speech made on 27 October 2009 at a plenary session entitled Singapore and the Rule of Law at the seasonal meeting of the New York State Bar Association's International Section in Singapore, Minister for Law K. Shanmugam said that he would not try to define the rule of law comprehensively or analyse it from an academic viewpoint, but, practically speaking, the key aspects of a society based on the rule of law are the following:

1. Exercise of State power should be through laws that are publicly known and enacted legitimately.
2. There should be independent, credible Courts to apply the law and decide on disputes between individuals, as well as between individuals and the State. There must be Separation of Powers.
3. No person should be above the law. That should apply in equal measure to the Government and officials as much as it does to everyone else.
4. There should be credible and effective means for people to challenge the arbitrary exercise of power.

However, evincing a thicker conception of the rule of law, he added that most people accepted two additional elements "as being part of how a modern civilised society should be structured", though he felt it was "debatable whether they are part of a strict definition of Rule of Law". These elements were that "[t]he people must have the sovereign right to elect their Government", and that "laws must not offend that society's norms of fairness and justice".

=== Thick conception ===
A number of critics of the Government of Singapore have adopted a thick, or substantive, conception of the rule of law that encompasses the protection of human rights. In a chapter entitled "Rights and the Rule of Law" in his 1994 book Dare to Change, Singapore Democratic Party (SDP) member (and later Secretary-General) Chee Soon Juan criticized, among other things, the Government's use of the Internal Security Act ("ISA") to detain persons without trial, and the lack of freedom of speech and assembly. In an open letter published on the SDP website dated 6 January 2009 which was addressed to the Chief Justice, Attorney-General and Law Minister, he said: "[T]he rule of law is not just a system where the government passes legislation and everyone unquestioningly obeys. The concept of the rule of law necessitates the limitation of state power and the respect of human rights. Our Constitution spells out what these limitations are. It also defines the rights of the citizen." And in a speech delivered to the International Bar Association Conference in Dubai on 4 November 2011, he cited a free media and the rights to free expression and peaceful assembly as essential elements of the rule of law.

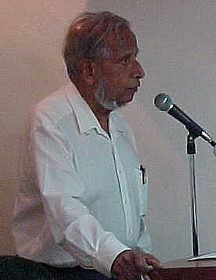
Opposition politician J.B. Jeyaretnam in November 2005. During a Parliamentary debate in 1999, Jeyaretnam articulated a thick conception of the rule of law that embodied human rights protection.

During the 24 November 1999 Parliamentary debate on the rule of law, Jeyaretnam traced the doctrine to Magna Carta, and said that it was to be found in the Constitution of Singapore, particularly in Article 9 and Article 12, which respectively protect the rights to life and personal liberty, and equality rights. He also noted that in the court judgment Ong Ah Chuan v Public Prosecutor (1980), the Privy Council had held that in phrases such as "in accordance with law" and "equality before the law" in the Constitution, the term law does not only mean Acts passed by Parliament, but also includes the fundamental rules of natural justice that have been accepted and become part and parcel of the common law. (Note: Jeyaretnam, "Rule of Law" (24 November 1999), cols. 572 and 574–575, citing Ong Ah Chuan, [1981] A.C. at 670, [1979–1980] S.L.R.(R.) at 722, para. 26.) He then cited eight instances of the Government's alleged non-compliance with the rule of law, including detention without trial under, among other things, the ISA and the Criminal Law (Temporary Provisions) Act ("CLTPA"); denial of the right of arrested persons to counsel and to visits from their families for a period of time; denial of the rights to freedom of speech and assembly; and the tendency of the executive not to provide reasons for decisions made. Opposition MP Chiam See Tong complained that the Government had not treated opposition parties fairly as regards applications for licences for events.

Criticisms about the ISA and the state of freedom of speech and assembly in Singapore also appear in reports by some foreign and international organizations. A 2007 report by Lawyers' Rights Watch Canada, Rule of Law in Singapore, alleged that defamation and bankruptcy law had been used to oppress the political opposition, and expressed concern about stringent limits on the freedom of assembly and detention under the ISA.

In its Rule of Law Index 2011, the World Justice Project defined the rule of law as "a rules-based system in which the following four universal principles are upheld":

- The government and its officials and agents are accountable under the law.
- The laws are clear, publicized, stable, and fair, and protect fundamental rights, including the security of persons and property.
- The process by which the laws are enacted, administered, and enforced is accessible, fair, and efficient.
- Access to justice is provided by competent, independent, and ethical adjudicators, attorneys or representatives, and judicial officers who are of sufficient number, have adequate resources, and reflect the makeup of the communities they serve. [Emphasis added.]

Singapore was ranked highly on factors such as order and security (with a ranking of 2 out of the 66 countries assessed), absence of corruption (4/66), and effective criminal justice (5/66), but less highly on open government (19/66), limited government powers (20/66) and fundamental rights (39/66). In particular, the Index noted that "[n]otwithstanding the country's outstanding performance in most categories, there are substantial limitations on freedom of speech and freedom of assembly, with Singapore in 49th and 60th place, respectively, out of all 66 countries".

The Human Rights Watch Singapore: Country Summary of January 2012 commented negatively on restrictions on the rights to free speech, assembly and association, such as limitations on print, broadcast and online media, and outdoor gatherings; contempt of court proceedings against Alan Shadrake; and the gazetting of The Online Citizen blog as a "political association", thus preventing it from receiving foreign funding. It also criticized the existence of the ISA and CLTPA, the use of caning as a punishment, and the continued criminalization of sexual acts between consenting men under section 377A of the Penal Code—which has since been repealed as of 2022. The Ministry of Law described the report as "inaccurate" and containing "false assertions".

== Compliance with rule of law principles in Singapore ==
=== Principles associated with the thin conception ===
==== Judicial independence ====
Raz identified judicial independence as one of the essential principles of the rule of law. In this context, judicial independence refers to the judiciary's independence from the legislative and executive branches of the government. Singapore's judiciary enjoys a certain measure of independence provided by various constitutional safeguards such as security of tenure and remuneration. Judges are also relatively free from executive and legislative influence. A retired Supreme Court judge, L.P. Thean, has said that it is theoretically possible for the executive to make political appointments to the Bench, to reduce a judge's remuneration by amending the Constitution, or to take away the judiciary's vital support staff, but "[t]he fact remains, however, that nothing of that kind has ever been done".

Various provisions of the Constitution guarantee the independence of the Supreme Court judiciary. Since Article 93 vests judicial power exclusively in the courts, judicial power is to be solely exercised by the judiciary and not by the executive or legislature, thus reflecting the former's independence from the other branches of government. Article 94 ensures that the office of a Supreme Court Judge will "not be abolished during his continuance in office", while Article 98 provides for judges' security of tenure until the age of 65 years, barring misbehaviour, inability, infirmity of body or mind, or any other cause that prevents judges from properly discharging the functions of their office. A judge may only be removed from office on these grounds by the President on the advice of a tribunal of judges of the Supreme Court or those who hold or have held equivalent offices in the Commonwealth. Article 98 also provides that the remuneration and other terms of office of Supreme Court judges may not be altered to their disadvantage following their appointment. Article 99 restricts parliamentary debate on the conduct of a Supreme Court judge unless on a substantive motion supported by at least a quarter of all MPs.

However, it has been argued by some commentators that Singapore falls short where some aspects of judicial independence are concerned. For instance, Supreme Court judges above the age of 65 may be reappointed on a term basis. It has been suggested that this may result in "the unsavoury possibility of judges being 'beholden' to the executive". This point was also raised by Jeyaretnam in Parliament in 1986 with respect to the then Chief Justice Wee Chong Jin. However, an academic has pointed out that removing entirely the system of extensions may not serve the larger interest at the end of the day if excellent judges have to retire due to the mandatory requirement.

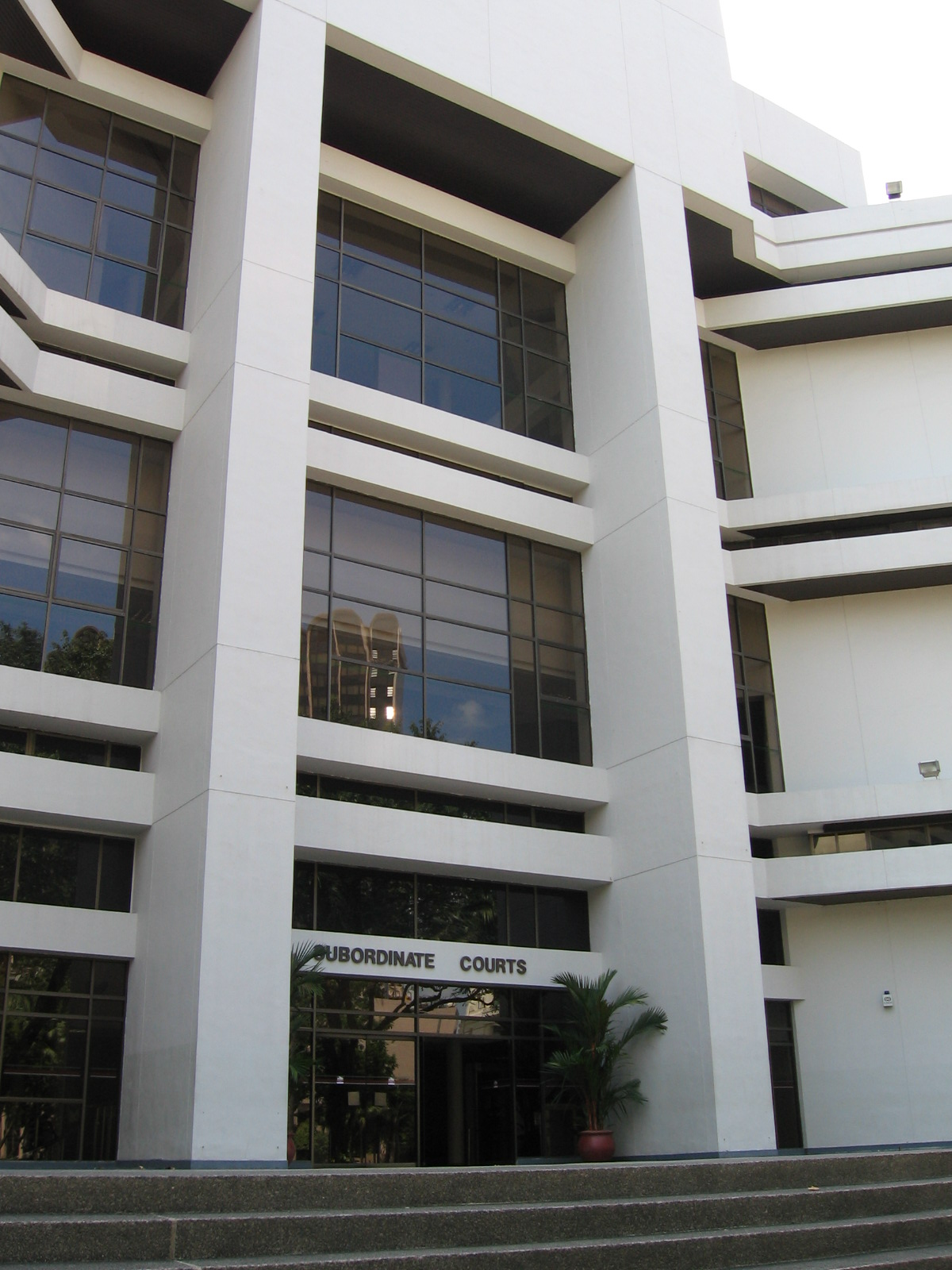
The main entrance to the Subordinate Courts of Singapore. Judges of the Subordinate Courts do not enjoy the same security of tenure as Supreme Court judges.

Judges of the Subordinate Courts do not enjoy the security of tenure enjoyed by the Supreme Court judges. As officers of the Singapore Legal Service, it is said that there is a risk of executive interference because judges may be removed from their judicial positions or transferred to lower-ranking positions elsewhere within the Legal Service by the Legal Service Commission (LSC). In 1984, the Senior District Judge Michael Khoo acquitted Opposition Member of Parliament J.B. Jeyaratnam of all but one minor charge in a case involving cheques for the Workers' Party of Singapore which had allegedly been fraudulently handled. The acquittal was overturned on appeal to the High Court, and a retrial ordered. However, before the retrial took place, Khoo was transferred from his position on the Bench to the Attorney-General's Chambers to take up the post of deputy public prosecutor. This was considered to be a demotion. In 1986, Jeyaratnam claimed in Parliament that the transfer had been made because Khoo had ruled in his favour in the 1984 case. However, a commission of inquiry formed to look into the circumstances surrounding the transfer found no evidence of this. For making the allegation, Jeyaratnam was referred to Parliament's Committee of Privileges for abusing parliamentary privilege. While the committee was considering the matter, Jeyaretnam wrote five newsletters about the committee's proceedings and sent them to residents of his constituency. On 9 October 1986, the Leader of the House made a written complaint regarding the newsletters' contents to the Speaker of Parliament, which the committee also considered. On 27 January 1987 Parliament accepted the committee's reports on the complaints and found Jeyaretnam guilty of abusing the privileges of Parliament by alleging executive interference in the judiciary, and of contempt of the Committee and Parliament by publishing the newsletters. Fines totalling S$26,000 were imposed.

Another concern which has been raised is that the routine shuffling of Subordinate Courts judges between the executive and judicial branches may result in them "imbib[ing] the executive's corporatist ideology, carrying that into adjudication, as a 'judiciary of amateurs'". On the other hand, while a potential for executive interference exists due to the LSC's control of Subordinate Court judicial appointments, it has been commented that in a small state like Singapore it may not be practical to have a separate judicial and legal service. Also, the appointment process may not be detrimental to the independence of the lower judiciary as the Chief Justice, who is not part of the executive or legislature, is the head of the LSC and has the final say on judicial postings. It has also been noted that, as much as institutional processes play a part in judicial independence, ultimately the willingness of judiciary to stand up to executive and legislative influence is the most important factor in ensuring an independent judiciary.

Another incident said to have affected judicial independence in Singapore was the move by Parliament to amend the Constitution and the ISA to reverse the effect of the Court of Appeal's decision Chng Suan Tze v. Minister of Home Affairs (1988) (discussed in detail below). It has been asked if Parliament had "taken away absolutely the judicial power of review for ISA preventive detention cases", and whether this reflected the Legislature's "distrust in the independence of the Judiciary and its ability to deal impartially with ISA cases that affect national security notwithstanding the limited form of judicial review laid down in Chng Suan Tze." Another commentator has framed it as "an attack on the judiciary simply because it removes a vital aspect of judicial power" and that this "undermines judicial credibility".

==== Natural justice ====
It has been noted generally that natural justice is a fundamental element of the rule of law. In administrative law, the two principles of natural justice, which constitute a framework for common law procedural rights, are the rule against bias (nemo iudex in causa sua, or "no man a judge in his own cause") and the right to be heard (audi alteram partem, or "hear the other side"). In the Australian case Gas and Fuel Corporation of Victoria v Wood Hall Ltd & Leonard Pipeline Contractors Ltd (1978), the Supreme Court of Victoria said that the ideas underlying both principles are that of "fairness and judgement only after a full and fair hearing given to all parties." Speaking in Parliament on 24 November 1999, MP Toh See Kiat expressed the view that the Singapore legal system does apply the rules of natural justice, which he described thus: "[N]atural justice requires essentially two basic principles. One is that you have the right to be heard and to explain your case, and, two, is the right to equal treatment. A right to have your case heard also means that there is a review."

As was noted previously, the word law in provisions of the Constitution such as Articles 9 and 12 includes fundamental rules of natural justice. Jack Tsen-Ta Lee has suggested that these fundamental rules are both procedural and substantive in nature, and that substantive natural justice gives the courts discretion to strike down a law if its very object is unreasonable and oppressive. Under this view, to interpret Article 9(1) as permitting Parliament to enact any provision that derogates from an individual's personal liberty no matter how arbitrary or oppressive as long as procedural natural justice is observed, drains it of all content. Also, instead of the invalidation of legislation in this manner being seen as an encroachment by the judiciary into the legislature's sphere, the application of substantive natural justice would simply be a full exercise of the judiciary's proper constitutional role. Lee submits that Singapore courts should follow the Indian courts and apply a reasonableness test to determine if legislation is substantively constitutional. Ultimately, being able to review legislation by applying the substantive aspect of natural justice would "entitle courts to examine whether it is appropriate for the legislature to deprive individual of certain aspects of their personal liberty, and the manner in which such deprivation is achieved."

Conversely, Andrew Harding has argued that the idea of substantive natural justice is vague and subjective, and has taken the view that fundamental rules of natural justice are entirely procedural in nature. In his opinion, Article 12(1) of the Constitution is designed to prevent substantively discriminatory legislation. To determine whether legislation is discriminatory, a rational nexus test is applied. It would be strange if legislation that passed this test could nonetheless be struck down due to inconsistency with natural justice. Therefore, the extension of Article 12(1) to include natural justice shows that the Privy Council in Ong Ah Chuan could not have intended to apply natural justice in a substantive sense. Further support for this argument can be found in the Privy Council's decision Haw Tua Tau v. Public Prosecutor (1981) which discussed fundamental rules of natural justice in a procedural context, their Lordships stating that they had to consider "whether the consequence of the alteration [of certain statutory provisions] is a procedure for the trial of criminal offences that is contrary to some fundamental rule of natural justice". The substantive review of legislation by the court was also rejected in Jabar bin Kadermastan v. Public Prosecutor (1995), the Court of Appeal holding that "any law which provides for the deprivation of a person's life or personal liberty, is valid and binding so long as it is validly passed by Parliament. The court is not concerned with whether it is also fair, just and reasonable as well." Subsequently, in Yong Vui Kong v. Attorney-General (2011), the Court held that fundamental rules of natural justice and the principles of natural justice in administrative law "are the same in nature and function, except that they operate at different levels of our legal order, one to invalidate legislation on the ground of unconstitutionality, and the other to invalidate administrative decisions on the ground of administrative law principles".

==== Judicial review ====
Judicial review is the means by which legal rights are protected and good governance enforced. The ability of the courts to judicially review legislation and administrative action is considered an element of the rule of law. In R. v. Committee of the Lords of the Judicial Committee of the Privy Council acting for the Visitor of the University of London, ex parte Vijayatunga (1987), Judge Simon Brown said: "Judicial review is the exercise of the court's inherent power at common law to determine whether action is lawful or not; in a word to uphold the rule of law".

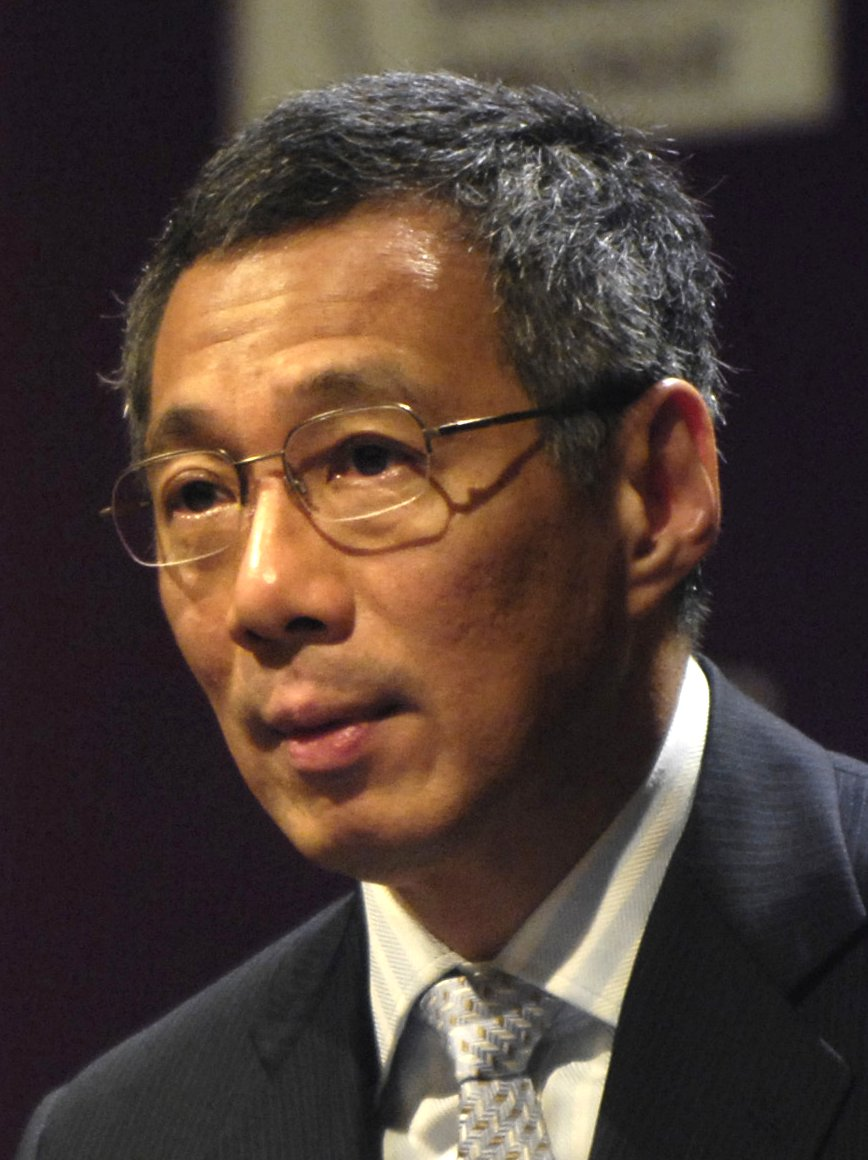
Prime Minister Lee Hsien Loong in June 2007. In a case brought by him against the publisher of the Far Eastern Economic Review that year, the High Court described situations in which judicial review would be inappropriate.

In Singapore, the vital role that the judiciary plays as a check on executive power was noted by the Court of Appeal in Chng Suan Tze, which held that all power given by law has legal limits and that "the rule of law demands that the courts should be able to examine the exercise of discretionary power". This is further illustrated by Law Society of Singapore v. Tan Guat Neo Phyllis (2008), in which it was stated that prosecutorial discretion is subject to judicial review and may be curtailed where exercised in bad faith or for extraneous purposes, or is in contravention of constitutional rights. In Chee Siok Chin v. Minister for Home Affairs (2005), the High Court held that if a litigant "genuinely seek[s] the court's assistance in vindicating or determining a legitimate grievance, the court has a duty to assess such a grievance and accord proper and serious consideration in determining whether relief should be granted". Chief Justice Chan Sek Keong has also said it is the role of the courts in Singapore to give litigants their rights, whilst simultaneously playing a supporting role in the promotion of good governance through the articulation of clear rules and principles by which the executive can conform with the rule of law. He noted that 27.8% of judicial review cases in Singapore since 1957 have been successful.

However, certain matters are regarded as impervious to judicial review owing to limitations in the courts' institutional capacity. Courts are generally reluctant to get involved in affairs relating to national security, leaving this role to the Government. At the same time, Singaporean courts are committed to careful scrutiny of matters to decide whether they are indeed non-justiciable, as affirmed in the Lee Hsien Loong v. Review Publishing Co. Ltd. (2007). This case held that courts would exclude matters involving "high policy" from their purview, but still analyse cases carefully to determine whether or not they truly fell within areas of executive immunity. Also, limitations on the role of the court have led to the rational conclusion that certain other areas are to be excluded from judicial review. These include matters in which the court lacks expertise and those which are polycentric, as was held in Yong Vui Kong v. Attorney-General.

==== Accessibility of justice ====
Generally, justice is costly to provide and many legal systems, especially in Asia, are fraught with issues such as weak legal institutions, corrupt and incompetent administrative officers and judges, excessive delays and limited access to justice stemming from high legal costs and the lack of legal aid. It was agreed during the World Justice Forum in 2008 that access to justice is key to advancing the rule of law.

The extent to which citizens have access to justice in any given society depends on whether a thick or thin conception of rule of law is adopted. Raz, speaking about a thin conception, proposed that the rule of the law requires courts to be accessible – that is, the legal system, at a bare minimum, should comprise formal institutions and mechanisms for administering appropriate legal processes and outcomes. A legal system complying with the thin rule of law also requires that laws are fairly, equally and effectively applied. On the other hand, when a thick conception of the rule of law is taken, a greater emphasis is placed on elements of substantive justice. It is suggested that a legal system operating as such may, in addition to the basic elements of access to justice in a thin rule of law, incorporate a moral or political philosophy, may incorporate ideas of "democracy and legality", and give precedence to human rights in the administration of justice. Access to justice operating under a thick rule of law may be achieved by, among other things, increasing the efficiency of the judicial process, and having a robust legal profession, an incorruptible and independent judiciary, and a set of supporting institutions in order to increase the quality of justice administered.

In Singapore, ensuring widespread and equal access to justice for Singapore citizens is a constant goal. In this respect, the judiciary takes effort to ensure that both procedural and substantive elements of the rule of law are fulfilled – firstly, by continually increasing the efficiency of the courts and legal processes, and secondly, by regularly improving the skills, knowledge and values of and judges.

In 1988, the Singapore courts undertook the enormous task of clearing their extremely large backlogs in order to facilitate Singapore's future development as an international business and finance centre. A multifaceted approach was adopted to dispose of cases expeditiously, including, among other things, the appointment of more judges and judicial commissioners, the use of information technology, electronic filing of documents and promoting the use of alternative dispute resolution. Such efforts significantly expedited the management of cases, both in the Supreme Court and the Subordinate Courts. In particular, specialized courts such as small claims tribunals, the Family Court and the Night Court were set up for better distribution of cases and have also helped to significantly reduce court fees. Over and above increasing the institutional capacity and efficiency of the courts, improving access to justice in Singapore has also meant a need for a corresponding increase in the quality of justice administered. Efforts to achieve this goal centre mainly on the appointment of the "best and brightest officers" and in particular, the constant upgrading of their skills and knowledge for judicial excellence. For this purpose, the Judicial Education Board was set up to provide guidance, training programmes and workshops for members of the judiciary, and is supported by a training unit within the Strategic Planning and Training Division of the Subordinate Courts. Such efforts aim to upgrade the competence of judges and equip them with the requisite knowledge for handling increasingly complex cases.

Today, there are relatively few barriers to court access for litigants. The availability of legal aid and free mediation services aid litigants who may not be able to afford legal fees, and the use of video links and establishment of regional offices of small claims tribunals in various parts of Singapore assist parties who have difficulty coming to court.

=== Principles associated with the thick conception ===
==== Criticisms of the Internal Security Act ====
As indicated above, a number of those who adopt a thick conception of the rule of law in Singapore criticize the existence of the Internal Security Act. The main point of contention is whether section 8(1) of the Act should be interpreted in a subjective or objective way. This provision states that "[i]f the President is satisfied with respect to any person that, with a view to preventing that person from acting in any manner prejudicial to the security of Singapore or any part thereof or to the maintenance of public order or essential services therein, it is necessary to do so", the Minister for Home Affairs shall order that the person be, among other things, detained without trial for up to two years.

In Lee Mau Seng v. Minister for Home Affairs (1971), the High Court affirmed that with respect to the President's satisfaction that a person is acting in any manner prejudicial to the security of Singapore, mala fides or bad faith was "not ... a justiciable issue in the context of the Act and the power conferred by the Act on a body such as the President who has to act in accordance with the advice of the Cabinet to direct the issue of an order of detention if the President is satisfied with a view to preventing a person from acting in any manner prejudicial to the security of Singapore etc". Essentially, this means that the President's satisfaction is subjective, and not objective. The effect of this decision is that "the Constitution left it to the executive, and not the judiciary, to decide what national security required". Subsequently, in Chng Suan Tze v. Minister for Home Affairs (1988), the Court of Appeal took a different stand, holding that the objective test should apply to the review of the exercise of discretion under sections 8 and 10 of the ISA. (Section 10 empowers the Minister to direct that a detention order be suspended "as the Minister sees fit", as well as to revoke such a direction.) The Court said that "the notion of a subjective or unfettered discretion is contrary to the rule of law" because "all power has legal limits", and therefore the exercise of discretionary power warrants examination by the court.

Following this decision, the Parliament moved quickly to curb the judiciary's change in stance. The Internal Security (Amendment) Act 1989 was enacted on 25 January 1989 and came into force on 30 January. In particular, section 8B(1) declared:

[T]he law governing the judicial review of any decision made or act done in pursuance of any power conferred upon the President or the Minister by the provisions of this Act shall be the same as was applicable and declared in Singapore on the 13th day of July 1971; and no part of the law before, on or after that date of any other country in the Commonwealth relating to judicial review shall apply.

Section 8B(2) contained an ouster clause that restricted the scope of judicial review to any question relating to compliance with any procedural requirements of the ISA governing acts or decisions by the President or the Home Affairs Minister. The amendments to the ISA were made retrospective by section 8D, which meant that they applied to judicial review proceedings that had been started before the amendment Act came into force. In addition, the Constitution was amended through the Constitution of the Republic of Singapore (Amendment) Act 1989 to prevent the Internal Security (Amendment) Act 1989 from being challenged as unconstitutional. Article 149(3) was inserted into the Constitution, with the effect that if the issue of whether any executive decision made pursuant to the ISA came before a court (whether before or after this constitutional amendment came into force on 27 January 1989), the court had to decide this issue according to the new provisions introduced by the 1989 ISA amendments. Article 149(1) was amended to add Articles 11 and 12 to the list of fundamental liberties that the ISA cannot be challenged against, and to extend its immunizing effect to the 1989 ISA amendments.

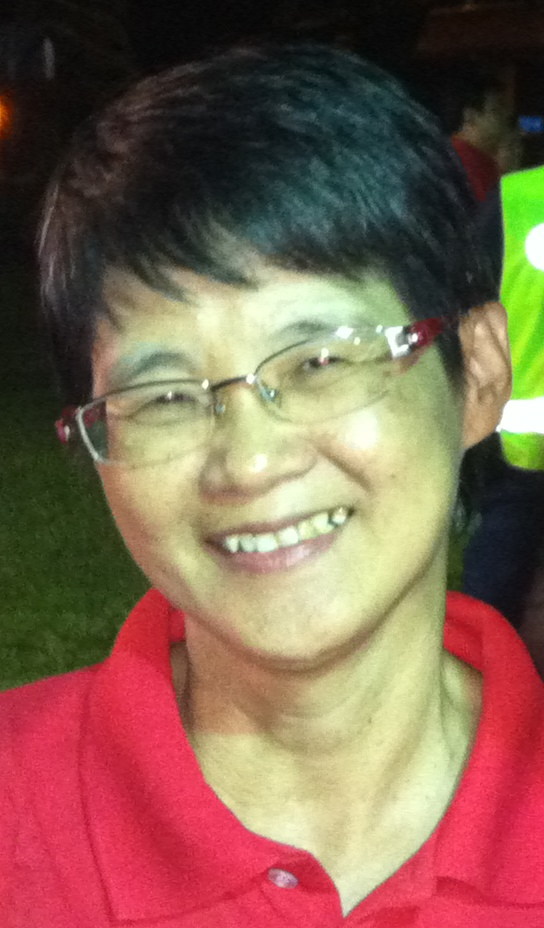
Teo Soh Lung at a Singapore Democratic Party rally for the 2011 general election. In 1989–1990, Teo, then an ISA detainee, unsuccessfully challenged the validity of the 1989 amendments to the Act.

The validity of the 1989 ISA amendments was challenged unsuccessfully before the High Court and Court of Appeal in 1989 and 1990 respectively in Teo Soh Lung v. Minister for Home Affairs. The High Court held that the 1989 amendments had merely reaffirmed the legal principles laid down in Lee Mau Seng and thus could not be characterized as being contrary to the rule of law or having usurped judicial power:

There is no abrogation of judicial power. It is erroneous to contend that the rule of law has been abolished by legislation and that Parliament has stated its absolute and conclusive judgment in applications for judicial review or other actions. Parliament has done no more than to enact the rule of law relating to the law applicable to judicial review. The legislation does not direct the court to enter a particular judgment or dismiss a particular case. The court is left to deal with the case on the basis of the amendments. Legislation designed against subversion must necessarily include provisions to ensure the effectiveness of preventive detention. The amendments are intended to do just that.

On appeal, the Court of Appeal confirmed that it had to decide the case in accordance with the legal principles laid down in Lee Mau Seng as the effect of section 8B(1) of the ISA was clear. Applying those legal principles, the Court held that the appellant had failed to prove that her detention had been made for reasons unrelated to national security.

During the 1999 parliamentary debate on the rule of law, Jeyaretnam asserted that detention without trial under the ISA contravened the doctrine as "there is no way of checking the Minister's decision, who decides to make an order detaining a subject, depriving him of his liberty, completely contrary to the rule of natural justice and the fundamental principle that all men are free". He called for the provisions in the Act permitting such detention to be repealed, saying: "The power is only necessary in emergency times when there is a real threat and so we do not need it any more. Let us for once realise that it is a violation of the Rule of Law. Let us be honest and repeal it." Nominated Member of Parliament Simon Tay expressed the view that "the ISA fulfills the Constitution as an exception. It does not fulfill the concept of the Rule of Law in the sense that there are only very limited grounds on which a court can review the decision of the Minister. It is in that sense a subjective discretion." Nonetheless, he recognized that the ISA remained relevant, for instance, as a tool against people alleged to have engaged in espionage, and thus preventive detention could not be definitively declared right or wrong: "It is a case-by-case decision, because that is how we live our lives in a real society." Responding to Jeyaretnam, Ho Peng Kee noted that the justifications for the ISA had been fully debated in Parliament on previous occasions, and emphasized that there are safeguards in place to tackle the apparent arbitrariness of detentions under the Act, including a review of each detention by an advisory board composed of a Supreme Court judge and two prominent members of the public, and also the President's personal discretion to order a detainee's release in the event that the advisory board and Home Affairs Minister disagreed over the necessity for the detention.

Speaking at the 2009 seasonal meeting of the New York State Bar Association's International Section in Singapore, Shanmugam explained that stability was one of the essential conditions for Singapore's governance, and that the ISA contributed to the stability of the country by enabling terrorist threats to be dealt with. In response, Michael Galligan, the Chairman of the International Section, wrote that "whatever might be appropriate for times of extraordinary danger should not be assumed to be the measure for ordinary times. Circumscription of liberties that may have some arguable justification in a national defense crisis should not set the norm for more peaceful or more 'ordinary' times in the life of a nation." In a 16 September 2011 statement, the Ministry of Home Affairs said that the Government had used the ISA "sparingly", and not for detaining people solely for their political beliefs. It expressed the view that "[t]he ISA continues to be relevant and crucial as a measure of last resort for the preservation of our national security".
