= Demon-cratic Singapore =

Comic strip by Leslie Chew

Demoncratic Singapore is an online satirical comic strip by Singapore cartoonist Leslie Chew, which began in May 2011. The comics are published almost daily on the Facebook page of the comic strip. As of June 9, 2014, the comic strip has over 40,000 followers on Facebook.

== Content ==
The theme of the comic strip is one making fun of a fictitious country. It appears that the author draws his inspirations from events happening in Singapore, and is thought to be using this medium to show his disapproval towards some of the policies of the Singapore Government, especially on the subject of the Central Provident Fund and its conscription system.

Shortly after his arrest in April 2013, the author dropped all references to the use of the word Singapore from his work, and changed his style from multiple panel comics to mostly single panel cartoons.

== Legal issues ==
In December 2012, the Attorney General's Chamber sent a demand letter to Chew to take down and apologise for a comic, to which he refused.

In April 2013, Chew was arrested for sedition over a comic which he has created in March 2013 that shows the population percentile of the Malay population steadily decreasing over the years despite their consistently higher Total Fertility Rate versus the other races. His parents' home was raided and the police confiscated all the computers, data storages, and phones in the property, as well as impounded his passport.

Chew was released after being detained for 46 hours on a S$10000 bail and was repeatedly made to report for bail renewal over a period of three months. During the time, he was forbidden to leave the country.

In July 2013, sedition charges against the artist were dropped. However, the AGC proceeded to charge Chew with contempt of court for four other comics. These charges were subsequently dropped after the cartoonist agreed to post an apology on his Facebook page.
