= Quentin Loh =

Singaporean judge

Quentin Loh Sze-On
- 罗赐安

Judge of the Supreme Court of Fiji
- In office 15 August 2018 – December 2022

Judge of the High Court of Singapore
- In office 1 June 2010 – December 2022

Quentin Loh
- Simplified Chinese: 罗赐安
- Traditional Chinese: 羅賜安
Transcriptions
Standard Mandarin
- Hanyu Pinyin: Luó Cìān
Yue: Cantonese
- Jyutping: lo4 ci3 on1

Quentin Loh Sze-On is a Singaporean judge who sat on the High Court of Singapore and the Supreme Court of Fiji.

== Legal career ==
In 1978, Loh founded the Cooma, Lau & Loh legal team and became Managing Partner. He was appointed Senior Counsel in 1999. He moved to the Executive Committee of Rajah & Tann in 2001, and became Deputy Managing Partner in 2003. He also served as Director of a dispute resolution complex until 2009.

== Supreme Court career ==
Loh was first appointed to the Supreme Court of Singapore as a Judicial Commissioner on 1 September 2009. On 1 June 2010, he was elevated to the position of High Court Judge. In December 2017, his term was extended by three years by president Halimah Yacob, and he was sworn in on 4 January 2018. He has occasionally sat on the Court of Appeal of Singapore during periods with a high caseload.

Loh is in charge of the Singapore International Commercial Court (SICC), and chairs both the SICC Development Committee and the SICC Rules Committee. He also chairs the Personal Injury (Claims Assessment) Review Committee and the Professional Training of Lawyers group. During the SICC's first case in November 2015, he said:

This court signifies not only the aspirations of Singapore to establish itself as a dispute-resolution hub, but it also reflects the needs of international trade and commerce... for different kinds of dispute-resolution methodologies.

As a judge, he specialises in law relating to construction, commercial litigation, and domestic and international arbitration.

=== Notable judgements ===
On the topic of same sex activity in Singapore, Loh was part of the team which rejected a constitutional challenge to the law which criminalizes such acts, arguing that it should be a matter for the legislature and not the courts.

Loh was responsible for convicting Alan Shadrake in the case of Shadrake v Attorney-General in 2011. Shadrake had been charged with the offence of scandalizing the court in Singapore with his book Once a Jolly Hangman: Singapore Justice in the Dock. Loh clarified and contextualized the law throughout the case and judgement.

=== Supreme Court of Fiji ===
On 15 August 2018, Loh was appointed to the non-resident panel of the Supreme Court of Fiji for three years. In this position, he sits alongside the Supreme Court Judges of Fiji to hear civil and commercial cases for a period of three weeks per year. The move was seen by Chief Justice Sundaresh Menon as "contributing to the development of the rule of law internationally".

== Other work ==
On 30 September 2015, Loh delivered the 27th Annual Lecture of the Singapore Law Review. His lecture, "The Singapore International Commercial Court: Entrenching Singapore’s Position as a Hub for Dispute Resolution", discussed the role and importance of the SICC and dispute resolution in general.

== Selected works ==
- Quentin Sze On Loh; Edwin Peng Khoon Lee (2007). Confidentiality in Arbitration: How Far Does it Extend?. Academy Pub. ISBN 978-981-05-8749-9.
