= Shadrake v Attorney-General =

2011 Singapore Court of Appeal judgment

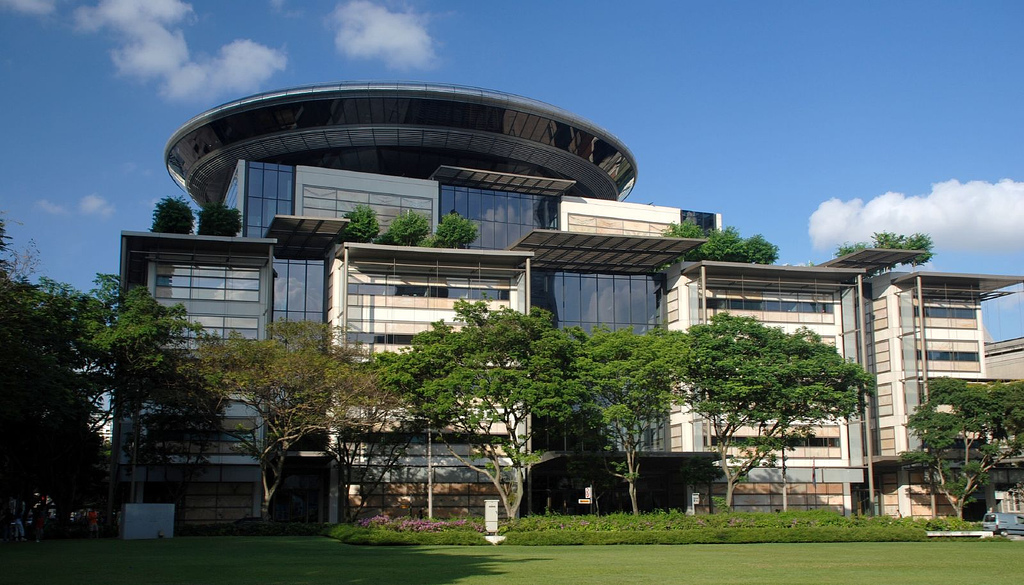
- The Supreme Court Building, Singapore, on 10 February 2007
- Court: Court of Appeal of Singapore
- Full case name: Shadrake Alan v. Attorney-General
- Decided: 27 May 2011
- Citations: [2011] SGCA 26, [2011] 3 S.L.R. 778

Case history
- Appealed from: [2010] SGHC 327, [2011] 2 S.L.R. 445; [2010] SGHC 339, [2011] 2 S.L.R. 506 (sentence)

Court membership
- Judges sitting: Andrew Phang Boon Leong J.A., Lai Siu Chiu and Philip Pillai JJ.

Case opinions
- The "real risk" test is the test for the actus reus of the offence of scandalising the court in Singapore, and fair criticism is an element relevant to liability rather than being a defence.

Shadrake Alan v. Attorney-General is a 2011 judgment of the Court of Appeal of Singapore that clarified the law relating to the offence of scandalising the court. Alan Shadrake, the author of the book Once a Jolly Hangman: Singapore Justice in the Dock (2010), was charged with contempt of court by way of scandalising the court. The Prosecution alleged that certain passages in his book asserted that the Singapore judiciary lacks independence, succumbs to political and economic pressure, and takes a person's position in society into account when sentencing; and that it is the method by which Singapore's ruling party, the People's Action Party, stifles political dissent in Singapore.

In the High Court, Justice Quentin Loh made significant changes to the law when he rejected the use of the long-standing "inherent tendency" test that had been applied to establish the actus reus of the offence, and instead adopted a "real risk" test. This allows a court to take into consideration the circumstances surrounding the uttering or publication of the impugned words and to only hold someone liable if that person has created a real risk in the circumstances in which the impugned words were communicated. In addition, he ruled that should an impugned statement be found to have scandalised the court, the only applicable defence to contempt of court would be if the statement amounted to "fair criticism". In doing so, he rejected justification and fair comment as defences. Applying the real risk test, Justice Loh found that 11 out of 14 impugned statements were contemptuous and that the defence of fair criticism did not apply to any of the statements. The High Court thus found Shadrake guilty of the offence of contempt by way of scandalising the court and sentenced him to six weeks' imprisonment and a fine of S$20,000.

Upon appeal, the Court of Appeal, while upholding the use of the real risk test, made several changes to the way the test is to be applied. In addition, the Court clarified that fair criticism is an element that determines whether there is liability, rather than operates as a defence. The Court, when applying its modified test, found that only nine of the 14 statements were contemptuous. It upheld the sentence passed by the High Court.

Both the High Court and Court of Appeal judgments explored the rationale for the law against contempt of court and its relation with freedom of speech, and emphasised the importance of public confidence in the administration of justice which can be impugned by contempt of court.

== Facts ==
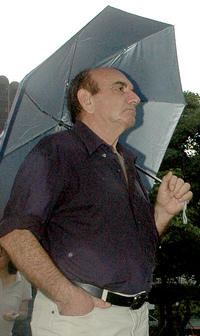
British journalist Alan Shadrake at a Reform Party rally at Speakers' Corner, Singapore, on 15 January 2011

In 2010, British investigative journalist Alan Shadrake was charged in Singapore with the offence of scandalising the court, a type of contempt of court. The Attorney-General alleged that he had scandalised the court by attacking its reputation in his 2010 book Once a Jolly Hangman: Singapore Justice in the Dock.

Fourteen statements of varying lengths from the book were purported to have alleged that the Singapore judiciary had succumbed to political and economic pressures when adjudicating matters concerning the death penalty, is biased against the economically and educationally disadvantaged, and is a tool of the ruling People's Action Party to stifle dissent within the political domain in Singapore.

Contempt of court by scandalising the court, also known as "scandalizing contempt", may be defined as "[a]ny act done or writing published calculated to bring a Court or a judge of the Court into contempt, or to lower his authority". The power to punish for contempt of court is vested in the judiciary by virtue of section 7(1) of the Supreme Court of Judicature Act. While contempt of court is a criminal offence, applications for committal are made under Order 52 of the Rules of Court, which is a civil procedure.

== High Court decision ==
=== Issues before the High Court ===
The legal issues that were dealt with by the High Court were the following: (1) the proper test to be applied for determining whether scandalising contempt was made out, and, specifically, whether the "inherent tendency" test or the "real risk" test should be applied to determine liability; (2) the defences available for the offence of scandalising contempt; and (3) the application of the appropriate legal principles to the 14 impugned statements.

=== Holding of the High Court ===
In a judgment dated 3 November 2010, the High Court rejected the long-standing inherent tendency test and instead adopted the real risk test. It stated that the only available defence to scandalising contempt was fair criticism, and explicitly rejected the common law defences of fair comment and justification applicable to the law of defamation. Upon the application of the real risk test, 11 out of the 14 impugned statements were found to be contemptuous.

==== Rationale for law of contempt of court ====
Justice Quentin Loh revisited the rationale for the law of scandalising the court. He examined cases from other jurisdictions to outline the raison d'être of the offence, including Attorney General v. Times Newspapers Ltd. (1973) by the House of Lords of the United Kingdom, Solicitor-General v. Radio Avon Ltd. (1977) by the Court of Appeal of New Zealand, Gallagher v. Durack (1983) by the High Court of Australia, and Secretary for Justice v. Oriental Press Group Ltd. (1998) by the Court of First Instance of Hong Kong. These cases identified the protection of public confidence in the administration of justice as the aim of the offence of scandalising contempt.

Justice Loh, referring to Judge of Appeal Andrew Phang Boon Leong's dicta in Pertamina Energy Trading Ltd. v. Karaha Bodas Co. LLC (2007), also clarified that the aim of the law of contempt of court is not to protect the dignity of judges. Rather, he emphasised the symbiotic relationship between the courts and the public – the public relies on the courts to administer justice, and the courts rely on the public for confidence in them. He hinted that the court's role in maintaining such public confidence was imputed in the common law, holding that "[i]t is ... an axiom of the common law that justice should not only be done, but should manifestly and undoubtedly be seen to be done". He also recognised that a balance must be struck between "ensuring that public confidence does not falter as a result of such attacks" and not "unduly restricting public discussion on the administration of justice".

==== Rejection of the inherent tendency test ====
The prevailing position in Singapore for liability for scandalising contempt prior to Shadrake was the inherent tendency test. This test required an evaluation of whether the comments made had "the inherent tendency to interfere with the administration of justice", which had to be proved beyond reasonable doubt. The test, first articulated in Attorney-General v. Wain (1991), was affirmed in Attorney-General v. Hertzberg (2009). There was no requirement to prove intent on the respondent's part to interfere with the administration of justice under this test. Intent was only a consideration at the sentencing stage.

The inherent tendency test theoretically has a lower threshold than the real risk test, thereby causing persons who are charged with scandalising contempt to be convicted for the offence with greater ease. In Shadrake, Justice Loh identified two problems with the inherent tendency test as it had been set out in Wain. First, the High Court had said that the justification for scandalising contempt was the prevention of interference with the administration of justice as opposed to protecting public confidence in the administration of justice. The former is the concern of sub judice contempt – that is, contempt relating to a case that is currently under consideration by a court – while it is the latter that is concerned with scandalising contempt. Secondly, such a test indicates that the words in the impugned publication or speech are to be looked at alone. This has the effect of ignoring the circumstances surrounding the utterance or publication of the words, and is excessively harsh.

==== Adoption of the real risk test ====
The High Court examined the law in various Commonwealth jurisdictions, noting that the test used for determining whether a person is guilty of scandalising contempt is the real risk test. Under this test, the threshold for liability is "a real risk, as opposed to a remote possibility". The Court also noted reservations that the Hong Kong Court of First Instance had brought up in implementing the real risk test. First, the test should be given its ordinary meaning – a real risk does not mean that it is more probable than not to occur, but instead means "a good chance as opposed to a mere possibility". Secondly, the impugned words must relate "to the section of the public whose confidence in the administration of justice must be affected".

Justice Loh recognised that the difference between the inherent tendency and real risk tests is not a matter of semantics. He opined that the inherent tendency formula is contentious because the literal meaning of inherent tendency would "obscure the fact that a contextual analysis is actually required." To unambiguously exclude statements which lack the potential effect of reducing public confidence in the administration of justice, Justice Loh thus adopted the real risk test, thus departing from the inherent tendency test used in earlier Singapore cases. He also emphasised several aspects of the test:

- A real risk is "something more than a de minimis, remote or fanciful risk. It must have substance, but need not be substantial." Thus, a small likelihood would also be considered a real risk.
- Whether a real risk to confidence in the administration of justice was posed is a question of fact to be determined objectively, taking all the circumstances of the case into consideration. This includes factors such as the person making the statement, the nature of the statement itself, how widely it has been published, and "local conditions" such as the size of Singapore and the multiracial and multi-religious make-up of its populace. Local conditions may also mean that since those who come into contact with the impugned publication or words may not be objective reasonable persons, the court must be open to take reference from such affected groups, instead of the objective reasonable man. In addition, the Court also stated that the fact that judges are the sole arbiters of fact and law must also be taken into account when assessing the impugned statement.
- The focus of the real risk test is whether there is a real risk to public confidence in the administration of justice, and neither the effect on the judge hearing the application for committal, nor whether a judge is personally offended by the publication. The requirement for such a real risk, "while very wide, is not illusory". Here, Justice Loh referred to a hypothetical situation mentioned in Hertzberg and opined as follows: "[I]f rants made at a dinner party are shown to have been ignored, I cannot see that they would pose a real risk to public confidence in the administration of justice".

==== Defences ====
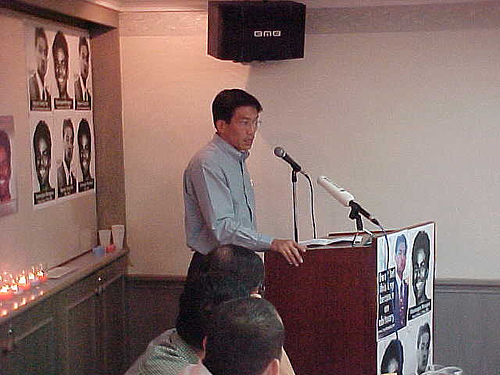
Singapore Democratic Party Secretary-General Chee Soon Juan speaking at a forum against capital punishment in November 2005. In a 2006 scandalising contempt case against him, the High Court rejected justification and fair comment as applicable defences.

Fair criticism was singled out as the only applicable defence available in the law of contempt. As the defamation defences of justification and fair comment were viewed as inappropriate in protecting the court from attacks, the High Court declined to recognise them as valid defences to scandalising contempt. Adopting the reasoning in Attorney-General v. Chee Soon Juan, the Court held that the defences of justification and fair comment in the law of defamation were not available in the law of contempt because of the overriding interest in protecting the public's confidence in the administration of justice, particularly when accusations against a judge's impartiality are mounted. Allowing the defence of fair comment would expose the courts to any belief published in good faith and not for an ulterior motive, even though it may be unreasonable. Similarly, the defence of justification would give malicious parties an added opportunity to subject the dignity of the courts to more attacks. The Court also noted that in Hertzberg, the purposes of contempt and defamation law were distinguished: "the law of contempt ... is concerned with the protection of the administration of justice and is grounded in public interest, while the law of defamation is concerned with the protection of a private individual's reputation".

The Court affirmed and elaborated on the view in Tan Liang Joo John, accepting that fair criticism does not amount to contempt of court. The burden of proof lies with the defendant to show that he was acting within his right of fair criticism. The elements of the defence are as follows:

- There should be some objective basis for the allegation made and it must be stated together with the criticism so that the readers may be able to evaluate the merits of the allegations. Proof to support the criticism is not necessary, merely some rational basis for it would be sufficient.
- The person must genuinely believe in the truth of the criticism made in good faith, which necessitates that the person must know the factual basis for his criticism before the allegation is made.
- While outspoken language is acceptable, abusive, intemperate or outrageous language is not. The requirement for respectfulness must be balanced by the fact that "the law in this area applies to everyone and not just those who are bound by the rules of court decorum. ... [I]t would not be reasonable to expect every person to adopt the refined language of scholarly discourse or court address."
- There is no limit to the kind of criticism which can be made against the court, subject to the above three criteria being met. People who genuinely believe that the court is partial and corrupt and have a rational basis for this belief should be able to say so without fear of being held in contempt. There is a powerful public interest that has been applied time and again in Singapore of exposing and rooting out impropriety and corruption on the part of those who hold public office, wherever or whoever they may be.

==== High Court's ruling on the impugned statements ====
The High Court individually examined the 14 statements impugned by the Attorney-General to determine whether some or all of them, contextually considered, posed a real risk to public confidence in the administration of justice. It also considered whether the statements were made with rational bases and/or in good faith so as to entitle Shadrake to claim fair criticism. In the end, the Court found that three of the statements were not contemptuous as they did not unambiguously refer to the courts. However, the remaining 11 statements were found to be in contempt as they had a real risk of reducing public confidence in the administration of justice in Singapore. Justice Loh put it thus:

Given that the book is or was available publicly, and continues to be circulated, there is certainly more than a remote possibility that, if the matter had been left unchecked, some members of the public might have believed Mr Shadrake's claims, and in so doing would have lost confidence in the administration of justice in Singapore.

The Court held that Shadrake could not rely on the defence of fair criticism as the statements were published "without any rational basis, or with reckless disregard as to their truth or falsehood ... [and] do not fall to be protected by the defence of fair criticism".

In a postscript, Justice Loh affirmed that the judiciary's interest is not in stifling public debate on matters of public interest which includes the conduct of judges. In fact, they are obliged to protect the freedom of speech guaranteed to citizens. Nevertheless, he held that there are limits on such debate in order to ensure that public confidence in the administration of justice is upheld.

=== Constitutional considerations in the High Court decision ===
Counsel for the defendant asserted that Article 14 of the Constitution of Singapore compelled the judge to adopt the real risk test. The relevant portions of the Article read as follows:

Freedom of speech, assembly and association

14.— (1) Subject to clauses (2) and (3) —

(a) every citizen of Singapore has the right to freedom of speech and expression; ...

(2) Parliament may by law impose —

(a) on the rights conferred by clause (1)(a), ... restrictions designed to ... provide against contempt of court ...

Article 14 does not define the offence of contempt and hence by necessary implication it is left to the courts to define it. Justice Loh stated that, in defining the offence, judges must be cognizant that the definition must be circumscribed by Article 14, to ensure a balance between the freedom of speech and the offence. Neither can be defined in a way that renders the other otiose.

Justice Loh went on to state that despite numerous references to constitutional authorities in other jurisdictions, the defendant's counsel had not directly addressed the issue of how Article 14 compelled the adoption of the real risk test. Thus, he had to "decline to enter into constitutional exposition". However, he noted that counsel had not submitted that the offence of scandalising contempt itself was unconstitutional, and that cases from other jurisdictions had held that the real risk test, together with the fair criticism defence, operated as a reasonable restriction on free speech.

=== Aftermath of the High Court decision ===
On 16 November 2010, Shadrake was sentenced to imprisonment for six weeks and fined S$20,000, at that time the heaviest punishment handed down in Singapore for scandalising contempt. Amnesty International decried the sentence as a "sharp blow to freedom of expression" and stated that Singapore had drawn even greater global attention to its lack of respect for free speech. A statement on the website of the British High Commission in Singapore, issued by the Foreign and Commonwealth Office in London, expressed dismay at Shadrake's sentence.

Justice Loh also created a buzz in legal circles by departing from the inherent tendency test and instead favouring the real risk test. According to lawyers who had studied such cases, what the judge did was significant because the real risk formula is clearer, even though he had defined it broadly. Under his definition, a statement with even a small risk of undermining public confidence in the courts would be found to be in contempt. The use of the real risk test is also significant as it comes at a time when the Government is planning to codify the law on contempt.

== Court of Appeal decision ==
=== Issues before the Court of Appeal ===
Shadrake appealed the High Court's judgment to the Court of Appeal, raising the following issues:

- The judge had erred in defining the content of the real risk test for liability for scandalising contempt.
- The judge had erred in his interpretation of the impugned statements.
- The sentence meted out by the judge was manifestly excessive.

=== Holding of the Court of Appeal ===
==== Principle behind contempt of court and constitutional considerations ====
The Court of Appeal's judgment was rendered on 27 May 2011 by Judge of Appeal Andrew Phang. Affirming the High Court's decision, the Court of Appeal held that the purpose of the law on scandalising contempt was to prevent erosion public confidence in the administration of justice, not the protection of the dignity of judges. The Court further affirmed that scandalising contempt was a public injury and not a private tort.

The Court also observed that the law on contempt of court operated against the broader legal canvas of the right to freedom of speech that is embodied within Article 14 of the Constitution as well as the common law. There is a need for balance: while the right to freedom of speech is not absolute, the law on contempt of court should also not unduly infringe the right.

==== Test for liability ====
The Court of Appeal affirmed that the mens rea or mental element for liability was the intentional publication of the allegedly contemptuous statement. The Court then focused on the actus reus of the offence, and considered the legal principles for identifying the suitable test for liability for scandalising contempt. In particular, the Court detailed the contents of the real risk test, the clear and present danger test, and the inherent tendency test. It held that the real risk test was the applicable test for scandalising contempt in Singapore.

===== Real risk test =====
The Court of Appeal held that the test for liability for scandalising contempt is whether there is a real risk that the impugned statement has undermined – or might undermine – public confidence in the administration of justice. It avoided a detailed elaboration of the test because it opined that the test demonstrated its value in application. On this point, the Court disagreed with the High Court's reference to "a small likelihood" of shaking public confidence in the administration of justice to describe a situation where no contempt was committed. It felt that such an instance would involve a marginal case of contempt that might not merit the initiation of contempt proceedings in the first place. Gary Chan has "warmly welcomed" the Court's confirmation that the real risk test applies in Singapore as this signals "a more liberal attitude towards the alleged contemnor in cases of scandalising contempt".

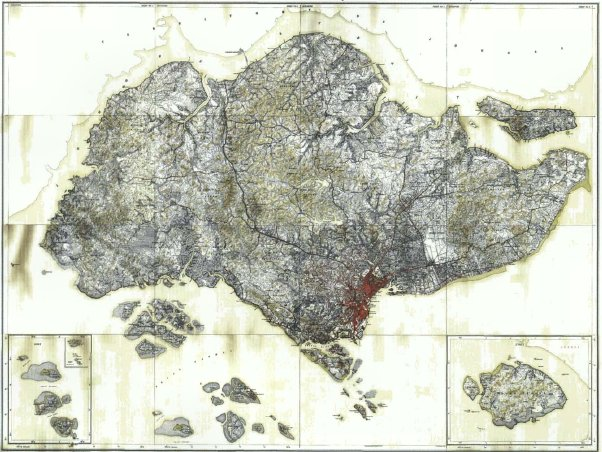
A composite map of Singapore and its islands, published by the Surveyor General of the Federated Malay States and Straits Settlements in 1924. The Court of Appeal held in the Shadrake case that Singapore's small physical size (710 km^{2} (270 sq mi)) is not a justification for the real risk test.

The Court then proceeded to make several clarifications regarding the test. First, in determining whether there was a real risk, the court has to make an objective decision based on the effect of the impugned statement on an ordinary reasonable person. The Court of Appeal disagreed with the High Court by holding that the concept of "the public" does not differ according to different factual matrices. However, the court should not substitute its own subjective view for that of the public. The factual matrices of each case are relevant as the backdrop against which to ascertain whether or not public confidence in the administration of justice has been undermined.

Gary Chan has commented that if a statement is only made to a small group of people, the confidence of the public at large in the administration of justice may not be shaken. Also, if the members of the group have some particular characteristic in common (for example, they are all lawyers or judges), an ordinary reasonable person's view as to the effect of the statement may not reflect the views of the group's members. Chan suggests a more appropriate test is that "the assessment should be made by the average reasonable person amongst the persons who were likely to become aware of the publication".

Secondly, the Court discounted the effect of the small physical size of Singapore as a justification for the real risk test. With the advent of the technological age and the Internet, information can be disseminated quickly and widely regardless of the geographical size of a particular jurisdiction. The Court also regarded the fact that judges in Singapore are the sole arbiters of fact and law as a neutral factor in such cases.

Thirdly, the Court of Appeal cautioned that in applying the real risk test, the court must avoid either extreme on the legal spectrum. One extreme is finding contempt where there is only a remote or fanciful possibility that public confidence in the administration of justice is undermined, while the other is finding contempt only in the most serious situations.

===== Clear and present danger test =====
With regard to the latter extreme, the Court of Appeal held that the concept of a real risk should not be equated with the concept of a clear and present danger as the two concepts have different meanings. The concept of a clear and present danger is a more stringent standard compared to the concept of a real risk. The latter encompasses the former but not vice versa.

The Court proceeded to reject the clear and present danger test for the following reasons. To begin with, the test is linked to the United States' unique culture and constitutional position on freedom of speech, which does not represent the position in most Commonwealth jurisdictions and Singapore. In particular, the First Amendment to the United States Constitution is quite different from the corresponding provisions in the respective constitutions of Commonwealth jurisdictions. The Court cautioned that the United States approach should not be followed as it could result in possible abuse and negation of the right itself. Furthermore, the Court emphasised that the real risk test is already a weighty test which pays the correct attention to the balance between the right to freedom of speech and the possibility of its abuse.

===== Inherent tendency test =====
The final test considered by the Court of Appeal was the inherent tendency test. This test entailed examining whether the words complained of have an inherent tendency to interfere with the administration of justice. Although the inherent tendency test was subsequently referred to in several High Court decisions, the Court of Appeal opined that there was no clear authority for the test. Further, the Court noted that the inherent tendency test had been ambiguously articulated in Wain as that case had not considered the precise relationship between the concepts of inherent tendency and real risk. Consequently, in subsequent cases the High Court had interpreted the concepts as distinct tests. The Court of Appeal held, however, that a holistic reading of Wain suggests that the tests are not different, given that they both evaluate the impact of statements on the public confidence in the administration of justice within the context of the case at hand.

The Court concluded that the distinction between the inherent tendency test and the real risk test therefore amounted to nothing more than a "legal red herring". However, in order to avoid controversy and misunderstanding, the Court held that the real risk test is to be preferred because it conveys clearly the legal test to layperson and lawyer alike.

==== Fair criticism ====
The Court of Appeal stated that case law was ambiguous as to whether the concept of fair criticism was a separate defence or an issue of liability forming an integral part of the process of analysis. In elaboration, the Court undertook an extensive survey of the Commonwealth case law, treatises on the law of contempt, the reports of various law commissions and committees, and legislation.

The Court of Appeal recognised that the approach adopted towards fair criticism has a practical implication on the evidential burden. If fair criticism goes towards liability, the burden would be on the party alleging the contempt to prove beyond reasonable doubt that the statement is not fair criticism and poses a real risk of undermining public confidence in the administration of justice. Conversely, if fair criticism is a defence to an allegation of contempt, the burden would be on the alleged contemnor to show on a balance of probabilities that the statement amounts to fair criticism.

Given the ambiguity in the legal sources and the policy decision involved, the Court took the view that Parliament would be in a better position to create a defence to contempt of court. Until Parliament did so, however, it was for the court to determine the operation of fair criticism at common law. On this point, the Court held that the concept of fair criticism should go towards liability. Due to the quasi-criminal nature of scandalising contempt, the alleged contemnor should not be disadvantaged by having the evidential burden placed on him or her. The Court of Appeal concluded with a caveat that the approach adopted was only provisional in nature, since the characterisation of fair criticism was not fully canvassed before it. Chan has said that requiring the Prosecution to prove the absence of fair criticism is to be "commended for enhancing the protection of the alleged contemnor’s right of free speech".

In approaching the concept of fair criticism going towards liability for contempt of court, the Court of Appeal held that the various non-exhaustive factors set out in Tan Liang Joo John were helpful in deciding whether the contemnor was liable for scandalising contempt. These factors include:

- The extent to which the allegedly fair criticism is supported by argument and evidence.
- The manner in which the alleged criticism is made.
- The party's attitude towards the court.
- The number of instances of contemning conduct.

In addition, the court ought to bear in mind the following key question: does the impugned statement constitute fair criticism, or does it cross the legal line by posing a real risk of undermining public confidence in the administration of justice?

The view has been taken that it may be rather burdensome for the Prosecution to have to prove the alleged contemnor was unaware of any rational basis for the criticism. Furthermore, although the Court did not mention this, since the effect of a statement has to be judged from an average reasonable person's point of view, perhaps the rational basis for the criticism should be apparent to the person in some manner. For example, there could be a requirement that the statement expressly mention the basis, or that it is possible to imply the basis from the statement. The basis might also be discernible from external sources such as media reports, so long as this is clear to an average reasonable person.

Further, the Court of Appeal rejected two arguments raised by the Prosecution circumscribing the scope of fair criticism. In the first place, the Court found that fair criticism should not be limited to criticism that does not question the independence, impartiality and integrity of courts. This would overly restrict the scope of fair criticism and render the concept redundant, given that most allegedly contemptuous statements, by their nature, call into question the independence, impartiality and integrity of the courts. Furthermore, Commonwealth courts have previously held that imputation of judicial impropriety is not ipso facto scandalising contempt.

Next, the Court found that fair criticism should not be limited to criticism raised through formal legal avenues, which include court proceedings and the removal of judges under Article 98(3) of the Constitution. This limitation overburdens the right of free speech, and a person should not be prevented from raising rationally supported criticism simply because he or she does not have access to formal avenues.

==== Court of Appeal's ruling on the impugned statements ====
The Court of Appeal applied the principles of law enunciated above to the 11 statements that were found to be contemptuous by the High Court. The Court held that "the statements should be read as statements emanating from a person who has held himself out as an investigative journalist and the actual or potential effect of the statements on the public should be assessed accordingly."

The Court of Appeal differed from the High Court in holding that nine of the 11 statements were contemptuous. It found that there was a real risk that these statements would undermine public confidence in the administration of justice as they suggested that the judiciary was influenced by considerations relating to politics, international trade and business; favoured wealthy and privileged people; and was compliant to instructions issued by the Government.

Three statements referred to the case of Vignes Mourthi, who had been convicted of drug trafficking and sentenced to death. Shadrake had drawn attention to the fact that one Sergeant Rajkumar from the Central Narcotics Bureau was under investigation for offences under the Prevention of Corruption Act at around the time he was giving evidence in Mourthi's case. Shadrake then stated that the high echelons of the judiciary knew about Rajkumar's misdeeds but deliberately suppressed knowledge of them until after Mourthi had been executed. There was no rational basis for these statements. Shadrake claimed that the judiciary would have known of the proceedings against Rajkumar because members of the subordinate judiciary, who deal with 95% of the cases in Singapore, and prosecutors, are both drawn from the Singapore Legal Service. Furthermore, some judges of the Supreme Court were elevated from the Subordinate Courts and had served stints in the Attorney-General's Chambers. The Court of Appeal agreed with the High Court's findings that this was too incredible and attenuated to form a rational basis for the claim.

The Court of Appeal found that the two remaining statements were not contemptuous of the courts. One of the statements could be construed as claiming that the Government, acting through the Prosecution, had chosen to bring reduced charges against a German national for fear of economic reprisals by the German government. The other statement was possibly directed at the People's Action Party, the ruling party of Singapore.

==== Sentence ====
The Court of Appeal stated that sentencing is neither an exact science nor an exercise of raw discretion. Sentencing is based on a set of guidelines that should not be applied rigidly as if they are "writ in jurisprudential stone". Instead, it should always depend on the precise facts and context concerned. To illustrate, the Court stated some of the sentencing guidelines enunciated in preceding cases, which include the following:

- The culpability of the contemnor, and the nature and gravity of the contempt.
- The seriousness of the occasion on which the contempt was committed.
- The number of contemptuous statements made.
- The type of contemptuous statements and how widely they were disseminated.
- How important it is to deter other people from acting in the same way.
- Whether the contemnor has committed similar offences in the past.
- Any remorse shown by the contemnor, for instance, in the form of a sincere apology.

The Court also held recognised that imprisonment should not be regarded as the starting point for sentences for scandalising contempt. The punishment imposed depends on the facts and the context of the case.

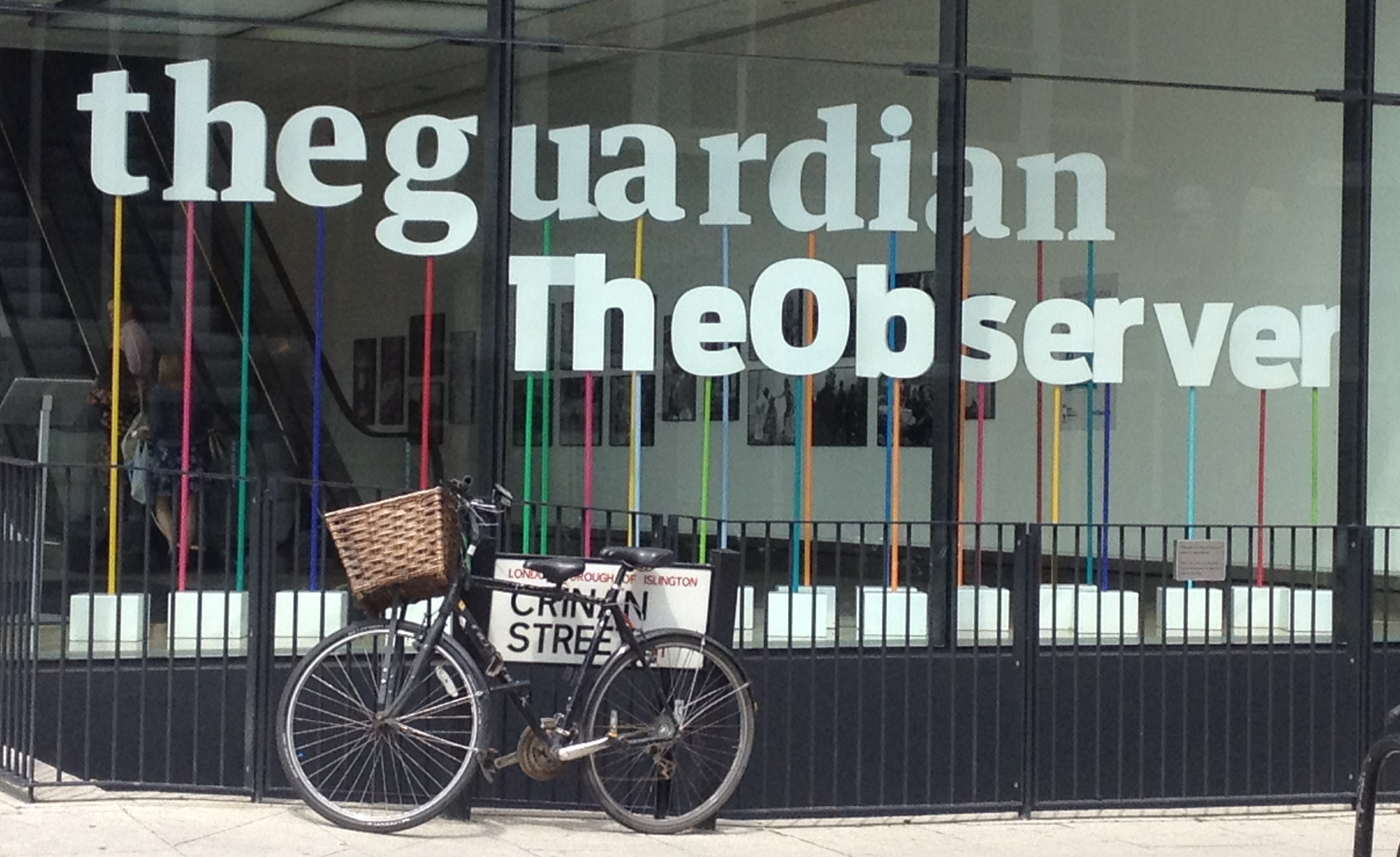
The London headquarters of The Guardian newspaper at Kings Place. The Court of Appeal held that remarks made to the newspaper by Shadrake following his conviction in the High Court showed he had no remorse about the contemptuous statements in his book.

On the facts of the case, the Court stated that although it had only found nine statements made by Shadrake to be contemptuous, these statements constituted serious acts of scandalising contempt. Furthermore, the extent and mode of publication and distribution aggravated the harm. The Court noted the admission by Shadrake's counsel that nearly 6,000 copies had been sold in Singapore and abroad due to heightened curiosity about the book during the trial. The medium of publication – a book – was also more permanent, compared to past cases which had involved articles in journals or magazines. This increased the risk of damage to public confidence in the administration of justice.

Conversely, there were no mitigating factors in Shadrake's favour. The Court of Appeal stated that Shadrake had not shown any remorse, but had continued to stand by the statements he made. Following the High Court's ruling on liability but before it had sentenced him, Shadrake had also given an interview to the UK newspaper The Guardian, in which he described his book as "devastatingly accurate" and declared that "[t]his story is never going away. I'll keep it on the boil for as long as I live. They're going to regret they ever started this." Furthermore, Shadrake had expressed an intention to produce a second edition of the book.

The Court of Appeal also disagreed with the High Court's approach of granting Shadrake an unquantified discount should be given in order to prevent stifling legitimate debate on the death penalty and other areas of law. The Court of Appeal maintained that such debate had always been open to all and would continue to be so, but such debate must not go overboard and constitute scandalising contempt. It affirmed the High Court's sentence of six weeks' imprisonment and a fine of $20,000, with an additional jail term of two weeks to run consecutively with the six-week term if the fine was not paid.
