= Alan Shadrake =

British author (born 1934)

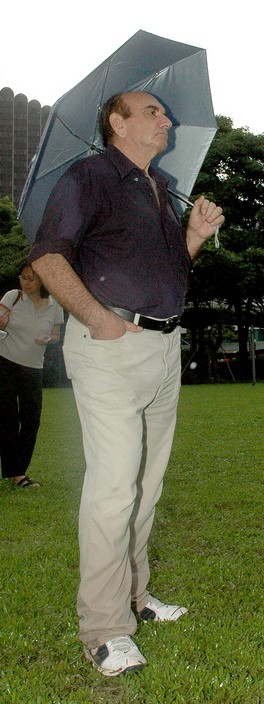
Shadrake attending a Reform Party rally on the mandatory death penalty at Speakers' Corner, Singapore, on 15 January 2011

Alan Shadrake (born mid-1934) is a British author and former journalist, who was convicted in Singapore in 2010 of contempt of court for scandalising the Singapore judicial system, through his published views on the country's criminal justice system. Following a failed appeal, he served 5½ weeks in prison.

== Career ==
After working with several local weeklies and a news agency, including Hornchurch and Upminster News, in Bolton, Lancashire, he joined the Daily Express in Manchester. He resigned in 1962 to freelance in West Berlin six months after the Berlin Wall was built and stayed until 1967. He returned to freelance in London and to start writing his first book The Yellow Pimpernels: Escape Stories of the Berlin Wall. In 1984 he moved to Santa Monica, California, where he freelanced with Star, Globe and the National Enquirer as well as UK and Australian magazines and tabloids.

While in Singapore, Shadrake became interested in the hangings in Singapore after comparing two different cases in the same year; Van Tuong Nguyen who was hanged after being found guilty of heroin trafficking at Changi airport and Michael McCrea who killed two people and was extradited from Australia after it was guaranteed that he would not be put to death. He would later find Darshan Singh, Singapore's executioner for nearly 50 years, to research for his book.

== Arrest and judicial process ==
After the publication of his book, Once a Jolly Hangman: Singapore Justice in the Dock, Shadrake, who had moved to Malaysia before the publication, returned to Singapore on 17 July 2010 for a launch party for his book.

On the next day after the launch party, Shadrake was arrested on charges of 'criminal defamation' via his book which criticised the Singapore judicial system.

Shadrake, a resident of adjacent Malaysia, was said by the Singapore Government to have "cast doubt on the impartiality and independence of the judiciary", and was also served with legal papers citing him for contempt by scandalising the court. The arrest and charge followed several previous instances where Singapore's leaders have sued journalists and political opponents for defamation.

His arrest and subsequent detention for two days received widespread media coverage and elicited calls for his release, including from Amnesty International, and renewed attention on Singapore's practice of capital punishment. He was released pending trial after a local activist posted his bail of S$10,000 (US$7,240).

Shadrake's case was in October and he mounted a vigorous defence, founded on the legal concept of 'fair criticism and fair comment'. His lawyer was M Ravi, a prominent human rights lawyer in Singapore.

During the trial, Reporters Without Borders launched a petition calling on the Singapore government to lift its restriction on Shadrake's travel, in view of his poor health.

On 2 November 2010, a verdict of guilty of contempt of court was rendered by High Court Judge Quentin Loh. Shadrake subsequently apologised if he had offended the sensitivities of the judiciary and did not mean to undermine the judges or the judiciary. The prosecutors felt that the apology was insincere and intended to lighten the sentence from the court. On 16 November, Shadrake was sentenced to six weeks in prison and fined S$20,000.

At the time of this verdict, Shadrake also faced separate charges of criminal defamation, punishable by up to two years in prison and a substantial fine.

On 10 April 2011, Shadrake appealed against his sentence. The Court of Appeal affirmed the original sentence on 27 May 2011 and he was jailed on 1 June. He was unable to pay the fine and his sentence was therefore increased by a default two weeks' jail to a total of eight weeks. On 9 July, he was released early 'for good behaviour' and deported back to Britain.

== Repercussions ==
Before Shadrake's book was published, Yale University had plans to establish a liberal arts college in conjunction with the National University of Singapore. Four Yale professors took issue with the question of academic freedom in a nation that hinders freedom of expression and, in light of the Shadrake verdict, asked the University administrators to reconsider establishing the college. They were unsuccessful, and Yale-NUS opened its doors in 2011.

== Personal life ==
Shadrake was born in Essex in England. After his third marriage to a Korean American ended in 1997 he moved to Las Vegas. In 2002 he was invited by the Singapore government to write travel features to attract American tourists. He stayed to marry his fourth wife, a Chinese Singaporean.

He has four children, six grandchildren and five great grandchildren.

== Bibliography ==
- The Yellow Pimpernels: escape stories of the Berlin Wall (1974), Hale
- Bruce Lee: The Man Only I Knew by his widow, Linda Lee with Max Caulfield
- Once a Jolly Hangman: Singapore Justice in the Dock (2010), ISBN 978-967-5-83200-0
- The Beast of Jersey by his wife Joan Paisnel with Max Caulfield
- Graham Young: The Boy Poisoner by his sister Winifred with Max Caulfield
- Queen of the Witches with Maxine Saunders
- Pray Silence by Ivor Spencer with Dennis Eisenberg.
