= Security of tenure =

Security of tenure is a term with multiple meanings according to jurisdiction. In Australia, it is used in political science to describe a constitutional or legal guarantee that a political office-holder cannot be removed from office except in exceptional and specified circumstances.

Without (political) security of tenure, an office-holder may find his or her ability to carry out their powers, functions and duties restricted by the fear that whoever disapproves of any of their decisions may be able to easily remove them from office in revenge. Security of tenure offers protection, by ensuring that an office-holder cannot be victimised for exercising their powers, functions and duties. It enables the democratic or constitutional methodology through which an office-holder comes to office not to be overturned except in the strictest and most extreme cases.

== Method of removal ==
The standard form of security of tenure offered to officeholders is usually that they can only be removed from office by either of two methods:

- removal from office following impeachment (a formal charge equivalent to a criminal law indictment) by parliament, using weighted majorities (usually a two-thirds majority);
- removal by courts for incapacity (mental, physical or psychological problems make them no longer for the foreseeable future be able to function in office).

Most presidents of states worldwide and most monarchs have security of tenure. Governors-General do not and can be dismissed by their head of state when formally advised to do so either by the prime minister or by the cabinet.

In the United States, while three presidents were impeached in the over two centuries existence of the presidency, (Andrew Johnson, Bill Clinton and Donald Trump), no president has been removed from office to date.

== Problems over lack of security of tenure ==
=== The Australian Dismissal Crisis in 1975 ===
Lack of security of tenure is regarded by some commentators as having contributed to the controversial decision of Australian governor-general Sir John Kerr to dismiss the prime minister, Gough Whitlam, in 1975. In the immediate aftermath of the dismissal critics, the Labor Party and much of the media criticised Kerr for not giving any advance indication that he intended to dismiss the prime minister. In systems where a head of state or representative of the head of state has security of tenure, both are in a position to exercise the third of Walter Bagehot's three maxims governing the rights of a head of state: the 'right to warn' that prime minister or government's actions or inactions are inadvisable and in breach either of constitutional law or constitutional conventions.

The problem for Kerr was that if he had made any threat to dismiss Whitlam, if the latter did not manage to solve the crisis facing Australia over the stalemate in parliament and the loss of supply could have been followed by a request by Whitlam to the Queen of Australia to dismiss Kerr and so pre-empt his own dismissal.

In a press conference after the withdrawal of his commission, Whitlam inadvertently highlighted this option when he told reporters:

"The Governor-General prevented me from getting in touch with the Queen by just withdrawing the Commission immediately. I was unable to communicate with the Queen, as I would have been entitled to do, if I'd had any warning of the course that he, the Governor-General, was to take."

As constitutionally, the Queen of Australia has no role in commissioning someone to form a government, or indeed in withdrawing someone's commission, her only active role would be with regard to who was governor-general. Other than that, her only possible role could have been to advise informally the Governor-General that it would be a mistake to dismiss Whitlam. (A then-advisor to Queen Elizabeth II indicated later that the advisor believed that she would have advised Kerr not to dismiss Whitlam had Kerr consulted her.)

Whatever about the wisdom of Kerr's decision to withdraw the commission of Whitlam, the lack of security of tenure meant that he had little room for prior consultation with Whitlam without raising the danger that he himself would be dismissed to halt any planned intervention. That fundamental design flaw forced an extreme solution of sorts on the crisis, whereas, protected by security of tenure, other heads of state would have had the option of informal consultation, even to the extent of warning the head of government that if the head of government persisted with a particular course of action, the head of state would have to intervene using the constitutional powers.

In contrasts, presidents of France, Italy, Ireland and elsewhere have been able in effect to warn prime ministers that they would have to intervene unless a solution to the crisis was found, with the prime ministers then being able to seek a compromise solution to the crisis to head off a head of state intervention.

=== The proposed Australian presidency ===
This design flaw in the Australian system was highlighted by international experts who briefed the Republic Advisory Committee in 1993 on the lessons to be learnt in moving from a constitutional monarchy to a republic. However, later that decade, Australia's constitutional convention produced a proposed model of Australian president that continued to lack security of tenure. During the 1999 referendum on becoming a republic, some critics asserted that the failure to provide security of tenure meant that the proposed presidency was fatally flawed from conception, with the officeholder unable to intervene except through a sudden, unannounced action such as that performed by Kerr in November 1975.

For that reason, support of the monarchy and other reasons, Australia voted to retain its constitutional monarchy in the referendum.

== Additional information ==
- Charles Lund Black, Jr. Impeachment: A Handbook (Yale University Press, 1998) ISBN 0-300-07950-8
- Bunreacht na hÉireann (the Constitution of Ireland See link below)
- Constitution of the United States of America (see link below)
- Jim Duffy, "Overseas studies: Ireland" in An Australian Republic: The Options - The Appendices (Republic Advisory Committee, Vol II, Commonwealth of Australia, 1993) ISBN 0-644-32589-5
- John M Kelly, The Constitution of Ireland (3rd edition, 1994)
- David Gwynn Morgan, Constitutional Law of Ireland ( Roundhall, 1990)
- Micheál Ó Cearúil, Bunreacht na hÉireann: A Study of the Irish Text (published by the All Party Oireachtas Committee on the Constitution, The Stationery Office, 1999).
- Hans Louis Trefousse, Impeachment of a President: Andrew Johnson, the Blacks and Reconstruction (Fordham University Press, 1999) ISBN 0-8232-1923-2
