= Offence of scandalizing the court in Singapore =

Crime in Singapore

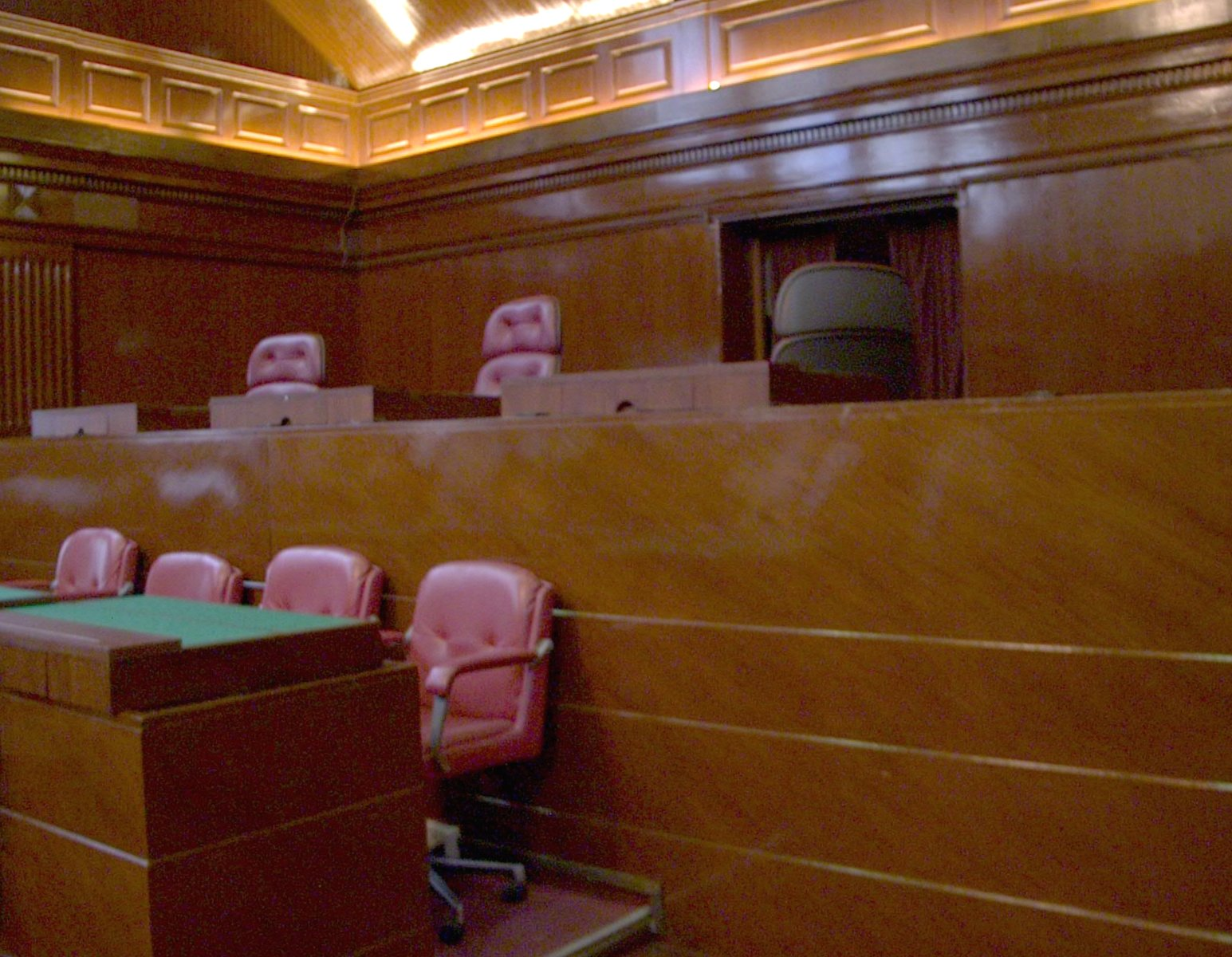
The courtroom in the Old Supreme Court Building that was used for sittings of the Court of Appeal, photographed in August 2008

In Singapore, the offence of scandalizing the court or scandalizing the judiciary is committed when a person performs any act or publishes any writing that is calculated to bring a court or a judge of the court into contempt, or to lower their authority. An act or statement that alleges bias, lack of impartiality, impropriety or any wrongdoing concerning a judge in the exercise of his judicial function falls within the offence. The courts of Singapore are empowered by the Administration of Justice (Protection) Act 2016 to punish for contempt of court. This provision is statutory recognition of the courts' inherent jurisdiction to uphold the proper administration of justice. Although Article 14(1)(a) of the Constitution of the Republic of Singapore protects every citizen's right to freedom of speech and expression, the High Court has held that the offence of scandalizing the court falls within the category of exceptions from the right to free speech expressly stipulated in Article 14(2)(a). Some commentators have expressed the view that the courts have placed excessive value on protecting the independence of the judiciary, and have given insufficient weight to free speech.

In Singapore, an "inherent tendency" test has been held to strike the right balance between the right to freedom of speech and the need to protect the dignity and integrity of the courts. To establish the offence, the claimant must prove beyond reasonable doubt that the act or words complained of have an inherent tendency to interfere with the administration of justice. The inherent tendency test has been held to be justified by the small geographical size of Singapore, the fact that there is no jury system and that judges have to decide both questions of law and fact, and that the test renders proof of damage to the administration of justice unnecessary.

Although Singapore law does not set out the sanctions that may be imposed for contempt of court, it is accepted that the courts may impose reasonable fines and imprisonment. To decide what punishment is appropriate, the culpability of the offender and the likely interference with the administration of justice are considered. The only defence available to the offence of scandalizing the court is to prove that the allegedly contemptuous act or statement amounts to fair criticism, which involves showing that the criticism was made respectfully and in good faith.

== Nature ==
"Contempt of court" is a generic term descriptive of conduct in relation to particular proceedings in a court of law which tends to undermine that system or to inhibit citizens from availing themselves of it for the settlement of their disputes. Despite the many forms it may take, contempt of court can be divided into two broad categories, contempt by interference and contempt by disobedience.

Scandalizing the court is an example of the first category. It comprises matters such as disrupting the court process itself (contempt in facie curiae – in the face of the court), publications or acts which risk prejudicing or interfering with particular legal proceedings, and publications or acts which interfere with the course of justice as a continuing process (for example, publications which "scandalize" the court). The second category comprises disobeying court orders and breaching undertakings given to the court.

The criminal offence of scandalizing the court is committed by any act done or writing published calculated to bring a court or a judge of the court into contempt, or to lower his authority. Any publication which alleges bias, lack of impartiality, impropriety or any wrongdoing concerning a judge in the exercise of his judicial function falls within the offence of scandalizing the court in Singapore.

=== Source of power to punish contempt ===
Fundamentally, the power to punish contempt is not derived from statute or from the common law per se but instead flows from the very raison d'être for a court of law: to uphold the proper administration of justice. All courts have an inherent jurisdiction to punish contempt committed when the court is in session by invoking a "summary process", meaning that the judge in front of whom the contemptuous act is committed may speedily order the contemnor to be punished. However, inherent jurisdiction to punish contempt committed outside court resides exclusively in the superior courts.

Section 10 of the Administration of Justice (Protection) Act 2016 governs the jurisdiction and power to punish for contempt of court. Under this section, the High Court and Court of Appeal hold full authority over contempt proceedings, with the High Court uniquely supervising contempt tied to the Court of Appeal and all lower courts. The State Court, Family Court, and Youth Court are restricted to punishing contempt committed directly in their presence or in immediate connection with their own proceedings, explicitly excluding Small Claims and Employment Claims Tribunals. Furthermore, the High Court maintains overriding authority and can transfer any specific subordinate court contempt case to itself, doing so either by its own motion, the alleged condemner's request, or mandatorily upon the Attorney-General's application.

=== Constitutionality ===
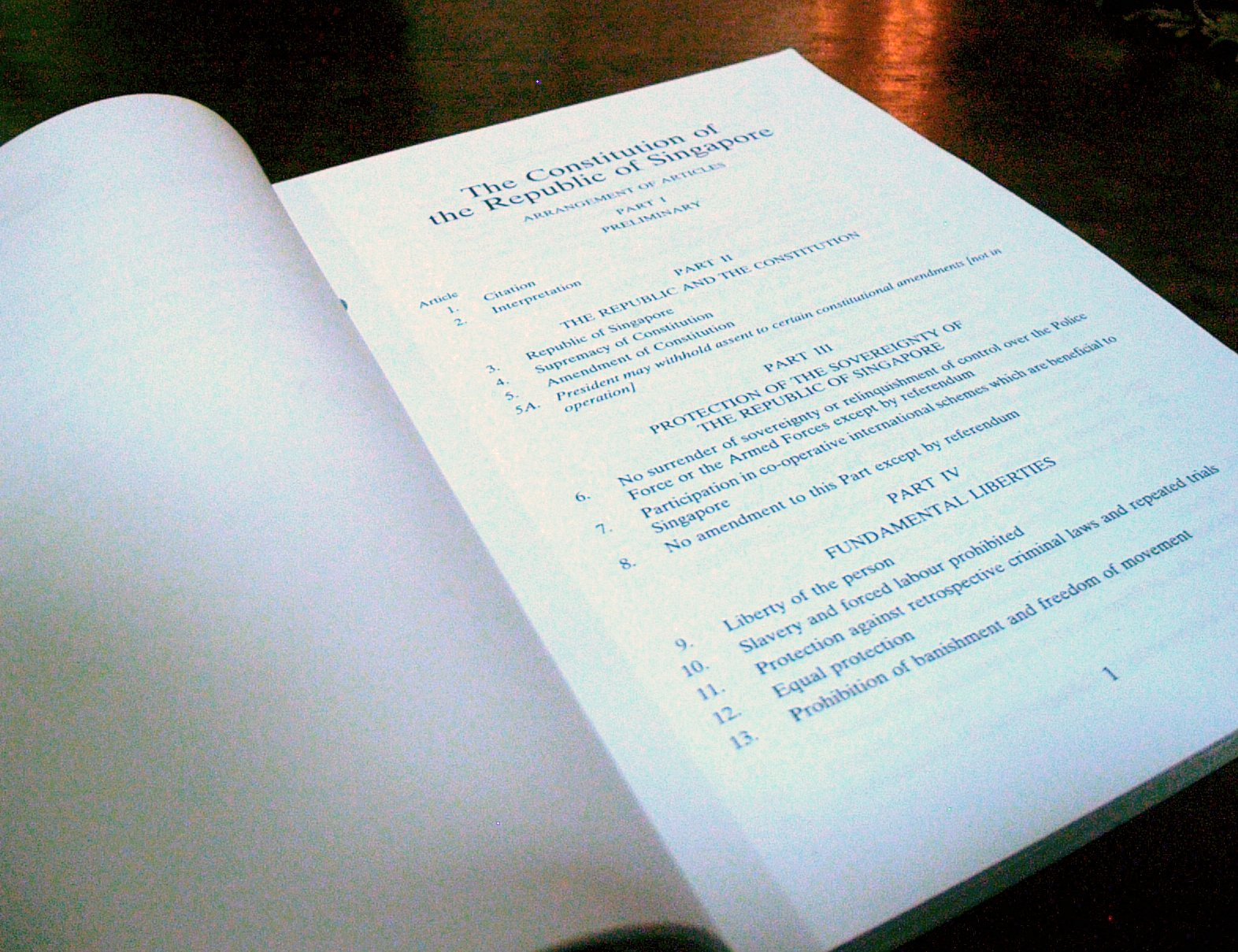
The 1999 Reprint of the Constitution of the Republic of Singapore

Article 14(1)(a) of the Constitution of the Republic of Singapore protects every citizen's right to freedom of speech and expression. This fundamental liberty was derived from the Federal Constitution of Malaysia when Singapore separated from Malaysia with effect from 9 August 1965. The Reid Constitutional Commission of 1957, which recommended that this provision be included in Malaysia's independence constitution, thought that this freedom was an "essential condition for a free and democratic way of life". However, as such a freedom cannot be unfettered, Article 14(2)(a) of the Singapore Constitution states, inter alia, that Parliament may by law impose on the rights conferred by clause (1)(a) restrictions designed to provide against contempt of court.

In 2006, the High Court held in Attorney-General v. Chee Soon Juan that the offence of scandalizing the court falls within the category of exceptions from the right to free speech expressly stipulated in Article 14(2)(a), and that the Article clearly confers on Parliament the power to restrict a person's right of free speech to punish acts of contempt. As a democratic society, Singapore has always recognized the need to ensure the independence of the judiciary. As the judiciary acts as a check and balance on the Cabinet and the Parliament, its integrity is of utmost concern in ensuring legitimacy of the Westminster model of governance. It is within this context that, in a 1991 decision, the Court expressed the view that freedom of speech "must be balanced against the needs of the administration of justice, one of which is to protect the integrity of the courts". The rationale for the law of contempt is rooted firmly in the public interest. It aims to protect the administration of justice as well as public confidence in it, which is crucial for the rule of law and the maintenance of law and order in any democratic society. It is not intended to protect the dignity of the courts or judges. When such interference is suppressed, it is because the structure of ordered life is at risk if the judiciary are so flouted and their authority wanes and is supplanted. Though the right to freedom of speech and expression is guaranteed under the Constitution, it does not mean that anyone is entitled under the guise of that freedom to make irresponsible accusations against the judiciary so as to undermine public confidence in the administration of justice.

Some commentators have expressed the view that excessive value has been placed by the courts on protecting the independence of the judiciary, and that insufficient weight has been given to the right to freedom of speech. One assumption said to be incorrect is that undermining public confidence in the administration of justice is in all circumstances harmful to the public interest. Arguably, if the scandalizing allegation is true or is an opinion honestly and reasonably held, then it is in the public interest that such speech be heard precisely because of the importance of the judiciary to society. However, common law rules of contempt do not recognize the defence of either justification or fair comment which are available to the tort of defamation. Secondly, the claim that scandalizing the court may undermine public confidence in the judiciary represents an unduly pessimistic view of the maturity and ability of the Singapore public to assess for itself whether or not the scandalizing speech is true, and is perhaps a sweeping statement as to general public awareness. Lastly, it is also assumed that public confidence in the judiciary can be preserved by the suppression of scandalizing speech. However, it is unlikely that such speech can ever be completely suppressed. It would be impossible to monitor speech that goes on in homes, coffee shops and hawker centres. Through these informal channels, suspicions of the judiciary may fester and grow.

== Test for the offence ==
=== "Real risk" test ===
A "real risk" test applies in many common law countries, including Hong Kong, New Zealand, and the United Kingdom. The real risk test requires that a complainant prove that the act or words created a real risk of prejudicing the administration of justice. The main reason for the adoption of the more liberal real risk test in these jurisdictions is the need to protect the right to freedom of speech and expression, as the broader test of inherent tendency is seen to inhibit the right to an unjustifiable degree.

=== "Inherent tendency" test ===
In Singapore, an "inherent tendency" test has been held to strike the right balance between the right to freedom of speech and expression, and the need to protect the dignity and integrity of the courts. To establish the offence, it is sufficient if the claimant can prove beyond reasonable doubt that the act or words complained of have an inherent tendency to interfere with the administration of justice. An act or statement has such an inherent tendency if it conveys to an average reasonable reader or viewer allegations of bias, lack of impartiality, impropriety or any wrongdoing concerning a judge (and a fortiori, a court) in the exercise of his judicial function. Thus, it is scandalizing the court to allege that it can be swayed by external pressures and made servile to others.

The Singapore courts prefer the inherent tendency test to the real risk test on the ground that Singapore's unique conditions necessitate that attacks on the integrity and impartiality of the courts be dealt with more firmly. In the 2009 decision Attorney-General v. Hertzberg, the following justifications for the inherent tendency test were given:

- Small geographical size. The small geographical size of Singapore renders its courts more susceptible to unjustified attacks.
- No jury system. Judges in Singapore decide both questions of law and fact, which renders the administration of justice "wholly in the hands of judges". Thus, any attacks on a judge's impartiality have to be "firmly dealt with".
- Proof of damage unnecessary. The inherent tendency test does not call for detailed proof of what in many instances will be unprovable, namely, that public confidence in the administration of justice was really impaired by the relevant publication. In addition, the test enables the court to step in before the damage – the impairment of public confidence in the administration of justice – actually occurs.

It has been noted that the relevance of Singapore's small geographical size to the application of the inherent tendency test is not self-evident and requires further explanation. The authority for this proposition was the Privy Council's judgement in an appeal from Mauritius, Ahnee v. Director of Public Prosecutions, where it was said:

In England [proceedings for scandalizing the court] are rare and none has been successfully brought for more than 60 years. But it is permissible to take into account that on a small island such as Mauritius the administration of justice is more vulnerable than in the United Kingdom. The need for the offence of scandalizing the court on a small island is greater ... [emphasis added].

However, the test for scandalizing the court applied in Ahnee was the real risk and not the inherent tendency test. It has been pointed out that this shows the value of free speech in democratic societies is a factor appropriate to a small island.

Further, the distinction between a legal system which utilizes judges as triers of both law and fact, as opposed to a system which incorporates jury trials, has been termed artificial. In a jurisdiction such as the United Kingdom, the same test applies to both jury and non-jury cases. Arguably in a non-jury legal system, there is more public interest in ensuring that judges remain accountable to the people. Hence, there should be greater freedom to discuss the manner in which judges carry out their functions. Finally, it has been said that the preference for the inherent tendency test because it allows the court to take action before the administration of justice is affected should be evaluated carefully, as it may have an undue chilling effect on speech.

== Characteristics ==
The offence of scandalizing the court can be committed in various ways, including the following:

- a publication in a print medium;
- a television or radio broadcast;
- pictures;
- physical acts;
- spoken words; or
- words displayed on a poster.

Allegations may scandalize the court by implication and association when contextually perceived by an average person. For printed publications, the failure to publish a fair or adequate summary of the reasons of the court and/or the omission of crucial facts may scandalize the court. The intention of the contemnor is irrelevant in establishing liability for contempt. Intention only becomes relevant when the court determines the appropriate sentence after having found the contemnor guilty. A publisher has a duty to ensure that his or her publication does not encompass matters that are in contempt of court, even if the contemptuous material in the publication represents the views of a third party and are not held or endorsed by the publisher.

== Sentencing ==
Section 12(1) of the Administration of Justice (Protection) Act 2016 set out the sanctions that may be imposed for contempt of court. The High Court and Court of Appeal can impose a maximum penalty of a $100,000 fine and 3 years' imprisonment for their own proceedings, whereas lower courts are limited to a $20,000 fine and 12 months' imprisonment. It is accepted that reasonable fines and imprisonment are permissible. To decide the severity of the punishment, the courts consider the culpability of the offender and the likely interference with the administration of justice. When determining the culpability of the contemnor, the courts may take the following factors into account:

- the nature of the contempt (that is, the seriousness of the imputations);
- who the contemnor is;
- the degree of his culpability (for instance, whether he is a repeat offender);
- how the contempt was published; and
- the kind of publication and the extent of the publication (that is, the number of publications over a period of time).

Other relevant considerations that may mitigate the severity of the sentence include the conduct of the respondent, for example, whether he argued against culpability, expressed regret over his conduct, and made an apology for his contempt of court. Although the real risk test has no bearing on liability, the likelihood that the respondent's acts or statements pose a real risk of harm to the administration of justice may be relevant for mitigation or aggravation of the punishment. These considerations are non-exhaustive and the importance and relevance of these factors is dependent on the facts of each case, although guidance may be drawn from previous cases.

Imprisonment is warranted when a contemptuous insult strikes at the "foundation, the body and the spirit of the justice system in Singapore". The High Court has reasoned that the rule of law is destabilized when the cornerstones of the judiciary – impartiality and independence – are attacked. As such, imprisonment serves as a deterrent tool.

== Defence of fair criticism ==
The only defence available to the offence of scandalizing the court is to prove that the allegedly contemptuous act or statement amounts to fair criticism. In order for criticism to be considered fair, it must be made in good faith and be respectful. Factors that a court will take into account to determine if the accused was acting in good faith include whether there are arguments and evidence backing up the act or statement, whether it is expressed in a temperate and dispassionate manner, the accused's attitude in court, and the number of instances of contemning conduct.

The defences of justification and fair comment are not applicable to the offence of scandalizing the court. The High Court has stated that since a belief published in good faith and not for an ulterior motive can amount to fair comment even though it is not a reasonable belief, permitting the defence of fair comment would "expose the integrity of the courts to unwarranted attacks", particularly since "Singapore judges do not have the habit of issuing public statements to defend themselves ... Our judges feel constrained by their position not to react to criticism and have no official forum in which they can respond". As for justification, it has been said that permitting the defence to be run would "give malicious parties an added opportunity to subject the dignity of the courts to more bouts of attacks; that is unacceptable".

== Cases of the offence ==
=== Shadrake v Attorney-General ===
In July 2010, British author Alan Shadrake was charged with contempt of court by way of scandalising the court, after alleging that the Singapore Judiciary lacked independence and was subject to pressure. The prosecution claimed that there were 14 statements that were contemptuous. The High Court adopted a "real risk" test, which allowed a court to take into consideration the circumstances surrounding the uttering or publication of the impugned words and to only hold someone liable if that person has created a real risk in the circumstances in which the impugned words were communicated. On application of the test, 11 of the 14 statements were found to be contemptuous. Shadrake was subsequently sentenced to six weeks' imprisonment and a fine of S$20,000. On appeal to the Court of Appeal, the Court of Appeal adopted a modified version of the real risk test, finding that only 9 of the 11 statements were contemptuous. It upheld the given sentence

=== Jolovan Wham and John Tan Liang Joo ===
On 11 May 2018, Social worker Jolovan Wham and Singapore Democratic Party (SDP) candidate John Tan Liang Joo were arrested after making several Facebook posts that questioned the independence of judges in Singapore. On 9 October 2018, they were convicted. They were the first to be convicted after new laws that took effect in October 2018 under the Administration of Justice (Protection) Act 2016.

=== Charles Yeo ===
In November 2022, Charles Yeo was convicted of contempt of court by scandalising the judiciary.

== See also ==
- Judicial system of Singapore
- Judicial independence in Singapore
