= Claridge =

Claridge is a surname. Notable people with the surname include:

- Bruce Claridge (1934–1999), Canadian football player
- Diane Claridge (born 1963), Bahamian mammalogist
- Dennis Claridge (1941–2018), American football player
- George Claridge (1794–1856), English cricketer
- George Frederick Claridge (1852–1931), South Australian philanthropist
- Gordon Claridge, British psychologist
- John Thomas Claridge (1792–1868), British lawyer and judge
- Manuela Kasper-Claridge (born 1959), German journalist
- Captain R. T. Claridge (Richard Tappin Claridge) (c. 1797–1857), English pioneer in asphalt production and hydrotherapy
- Ryan Claridge (born 1981), American football player
- Shaaron Claridge, American voice actress
- Simon Claridge, (born 1980), British artist
- Steve Claridge (born 1966), English footballer, coach and pundit
- Travis Claridge (1978–2006), American football player
- Michael Claridge (born 1934), British entomologist.

== See also ==
- Claridge Hi-Tec/Goncz Pistol
- Claridge Hotel (disambiguation), various hotels
- Claridge Records, a New York-based record label
- Claridge, Pennsylvania
- Clarridge (surname)
