= K. S. Rajah =

Singaporean lawyer

K. S. Rajah PBM SC

Judicial Commissioner
- In office 15 May 1991 – 2 March 1995

Personal details
- Born: Kasinather Saunthararajah; 3 March 1930 Perai, Penang, Straits Settlements (now Malaysia)
- Died: 17 June 2010 (aged 80) Singapore
- Education: University of Singapore (LL.B. (Hons.), 1963)
- Profession: Lawyer
- Awards: PBM (2002); C.C. Tan Award (2008)

Kasinather Saunthararajah PBM SC (3 March 1930 – 17 June 2010), known professionally as K. S. Rajah, was a Senior Counsel and Judicial Commissioner of the Supreme Court of Singapore.

Rajah spent the 22 years with the Singapore Legal Service, eventually heading the civil and criminal divisions of the Attorney-General's Chambers and also serving as Director of the Singapore Legal Aid Bureau and head of the Official Assignee and Public Trustee's Office. In 1985 he retired from the Legal Service and went into private practice, establishing the firm of B. Rao & K. S. Rajah.

In 1991, Rajah was appointed a Judicial Commissioner of the Supreme Court of Singapore. His time on the Bench was marked by a number of significant family law cases, including one in 1991 in which he held that since the gender of a transsexual person was to be determined according to biological criteria, sex reassignment surgery did not alter a person's gender. Thus, a transsexual person is only allowed to marry in their original biological gender. The decision prompted Parliament to amend the Women's Charter in 1996 to permit transsexual people to marry in the capacity of their new gender.

Rajah retired as a judge in 1995 and joined Harry Elias & Partners as a consultant. He also became the first President of the Tribunal for the Maintenance of Parents in 1996. The following year, he was appointed Senior Counsel in the first group of lawyers to be conferred this status. A member of the Singapore Mediation Centre and the Singapore International Arbitration Centre, he was active as a mediator and arbitrator. A frequent contributor to the Malayan Law Journal and the Singapore Law Gazette, particularly on criminal law and constitutional matters, a number of his legal articles provoked controversy.

Rajah was the Chairman of the Sri Aurobindo Society Singapore, the Secretary and later the President of the Hindu Centre, and the Vice-President of the Singapore Anti-Narcotics Association. He also served with the Hindu Endowments Board and the Society for the Physically Disabled. He was conferred the Pingat Bakti Masyarakat (Public Service Medal) at the National Day Awards in August 2002, and in 2008 received the C.C. Tan Award, which recognizes lawyers who display the highest ideals of the profession, from the Law Society of Singapore.

== Early years and education ==
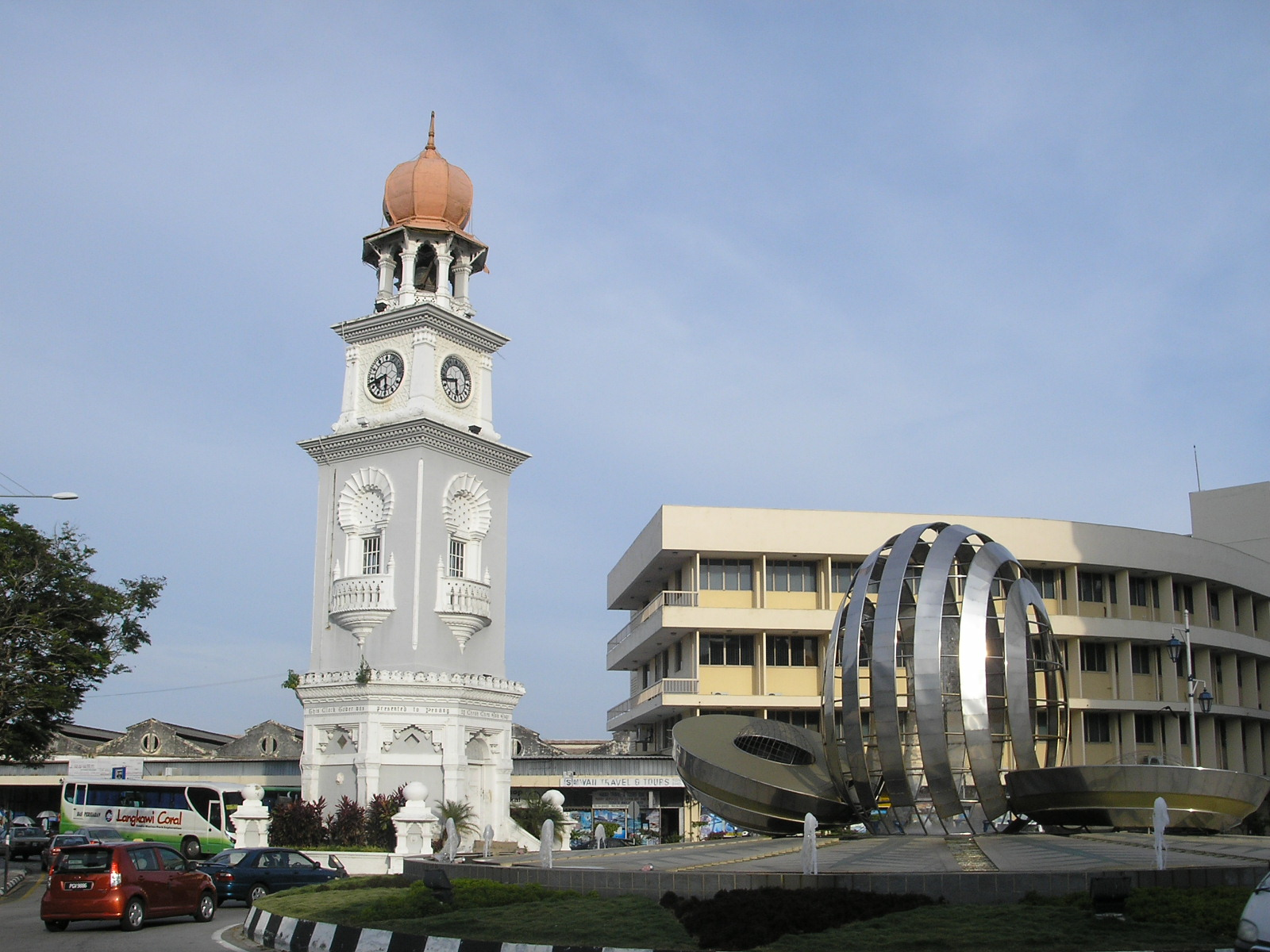
The Queen Victoria Diamond Jubilee Clock Tower in George Town, Penang, photographed December 2006

The eldest of 13 children of a Sri Lankan couple, K. S. Rajah was born in Perai, Province Wellesley (now Seberang Perai), Penang, in what was then the Straits Settlements (now Malaysia) on 3 March 1930. His father was a clerk, and as the family was not well off he often could not afford books and had to borrow them and copy out texts by hand. He was a pupil of the Bukit Mertajam High School. Still a student during the Japanese Occupation, to contribute towards his family's finances he worked as a mess boy at a Japanese officers' mess and later as a translator for the Japanese authorities.

In 1959, Rajah joined the pioneer batch of law undergraduates at the University of Malaya in Singapore to study law part-time. The university became known as the University of Singapore in 1962, and Rajah graduated from it with a Bachelor of Laws with honours (LL.B. (Hons.)) the following year.

== Career ==
Rajah left school at the age of 16 years. His first job was as a Wireless operator on shore for the Penang port authority, using Morse code to communicate with vessels at sea. Coming to Singapore in 1950, he started working as a teacher at Sembawang Primary School, and was sent for further training in the United Kingdom in 1953 on a scholarship from the Ministry of Education. On his return, he lectured at the Teachers' Training College. He became a Singapore citizen in 1958.

=== Legal career ===
==== Singapore Legal Service ====
Rajah joined the Singapore Legal Service in 1963, becoming a deputy public prosecutor and, later, senior state counsel with the Attorney-General's Chambers. He was admitted to the Bar on 18 May 1966. He handled a number of prominent criminal matters, including the Pulau Senang prison riot and Sunny Ang murder trials; and the Gold Bar murder case, in which a Hong Kong seaman was found to have tried to unlawfully import 165 gold bars and 134 gold coins worth S$86,076.70 without a permit. In September 1967 he led the prosecution of 262 members of the Barisan Sosialis political party for unlawful assembly and disturbing the peace, Singapore's largest criminal trial. He eventually led the Chambers' civil and criminal sections until 2 August 1972, when he was appointed to head the Official Assignee and Public Trustee's Office. He was also the longest-serving Director of the Singapore Legal Aid Bureau. In 1985, he retired from the Legal Service and went into private practice, establishing the firm of B. Rao & K. S. Rajah.

==== Judicial Commissioner ====
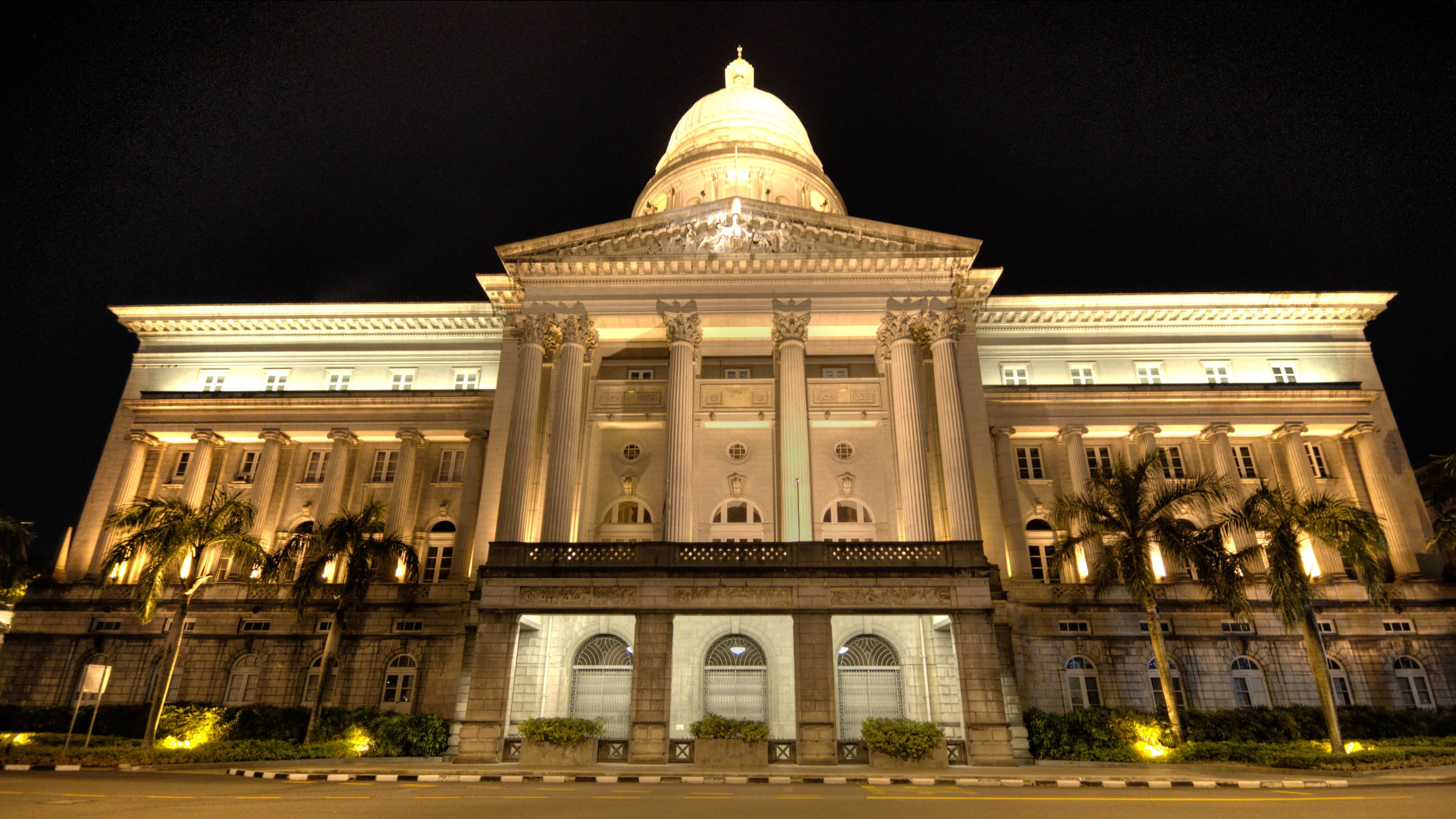
The Old Supreme Court Building, where K. S. Rajah served as a Judicial Commissioner between 1991 and 1995, photographed in May 2009

Between 15 May 1991 and 2 March 1995, Rajah served as a Judicial Commissioner of the Supreme Court of Singapore. During his time on the Bench, he decided a number of significant family law cases. In Lim Ying v. Hock Kian Ming Eric, he held that the gender of a transsexual person was to be determined according to biological criteria, which meant that sex reassignment surgery did not alter a person's gender. Thus, a marriage between an individual who had undergone female-to-male sex reassignment surgery and a woman was void, being a marriage between two persons of the same gender. The decision prompted Parliament to amend the Women's Charter to permit transsexual people to marry in the capacity of their new gender. In 1992, Rajah J.C. annulled the marriage of a 21-year-old woman whose family had forced her into an arranged marriage. This was believed to have been the first judicial decision of its kind in Singapore. Two years later, in another landmark case, he applied to a house-husband the principle that a divorced woman who has not contributed financially towards the acquisition of matrimonial assets is nonetheless entitled to a substantial share of them in view of her indirect contributions in the form of paying towards the household expenses or caring for the family.

==== Private practice ====
Following his retirement as a judge, Rajah joined the law firm Harry Elias & Partners (now known as Harry Elias Partnership LLP) as a consultant. He also became the first President of the Tribunal for the Maintenance of Parents, established in 1996 to entitle parents at least 60 years old and unable to maintain themselves adequately to apply for their children to be ordered to pay maintenance to them. In addition, he served as Chairman of the Law Society of Singapore's Committee on Guidance for the Legal Profession on Anti-Money Laundering. In 1997, Rajah was appointed Senior Counsel in the first group of lawyers to be conferred this status. He was subsequently appointed a member of the Singapore Mediation Centre in 1998, and of the Singapore International Arbitration Centre in 2003. He acted as sole arbitrator and as chairman of arbitral tribunals in domestic and international arbitrations, in particular arbitrations taking place in Bangladesh and India. He was also a referee of the Ministry of Manpower's Industrial Arbitration Court.

Rajah was an active contributor of legal articles to the Malayan Law Journal and the Singapore Law Gazette. An article in the August 2003 issue of the Law Gazette entitled "The Unconstitutional Punishment", which argued that the mandatory death penalty in Singapore was contrary to the Constitution of Singapore, was obliquely criticized by the Chief Justice Yong Pung How. Rajah, appearing before Yong C.J. in an appeal, submitted that a magistrate should have allowed his client to compound her offence of abusing her maid, arguing that "[t]he idea of composition is international". The Chief Justice said that Rajah, a person of "tremendous experience and wide learning", had stated in one of his "wonderful articles" that the death penalty was unconstitutional due to international law. However, he remarked: "I am not concerned with international law. I am a poor humble servant of the law in Singapore. Little island." On 22 March 2005, Rajah delivered a speech on the subject of his article at a LAWASIA conference in the Gold Coast, Queensland, Australia. Another Law Gazette article published in January 2006 which argued that the Court of Appeal's conviction of two men accused of murder who had been acquitted by the High Court violated the constitutional protection against double jeopardy was said by the Ministry of Law to be "legally flawed".

In his last case in 2008, he represented certain minority owners of flats in the Horizon Towers condominium before the High Court in their bid to block the collective sale of the housing development supported by a majority of flat owners. He argued, among other things, that the right to acquire, hold and dispose of property was enshrined in the Constitution, but failed to convince the judge. Although the minority owners were unsuccessful at trial, the judgment was later reversed by the Court of Appeal.

== Personal life ==
In December 1959 Rajah married his wife Gnanambigai.

Active in volunteer work, Rajah was the Chairman of the Sri Aurobindo Society Singapore the Secretary and later the President of the Hindu Centre, and the Vice-President of the Singapore Anti-Narcotics Association. He also served with the Hindu Endowments Board, Kong Meng San Phor Kark See Temple, Mount Alvernia Hospital and the Society for the Physically Disabled.

Rajah died in hospital on 17 June 2010 at the age of 80 years, having suffered from angiosarcoma, a rare cancer of the lining of the blood vessels, of the scalp for a year. He was survived by his wife Gnanambigai Rajah; his two sons, and two daughters; eight grandchildren.

== Awards and honours ==
Rajah was conferred the Pingat Bakti Masyarakat (Public Service Medal) at the National Day Awards in August 2002. In October 2008 he received the C.C. Tan Award, which recognizes lawyers who display the highest ideals of the profession, from the Law Society for "his personal integrity, honesty and outstanding contributions to the legal profession".

== Selected works ==
=== Articles and book chapters ===
- "Burden of Proof and Reasonable Doubt", Malayan Law Journal, 1: xxvi, 1971. (See also Loh, James Ching Yew (1971), "Burden of Proof and Reasonable Doubt – A Critique and Reply", Malayan Law Journal, 1: li.)
- "Ignored Joinder", Malayan Law Journal, 2: xxxiv, 1972.
- "Cross-examination on Contents of a Statement in Issue", Malayan Law Journal, 2: xlvi, 1972.
- "Women's Charter and Customary Marriages", Malayan Law Journal, 2: xlvi, 1974.
- "On Disproving Fingerprint Evidence", Malayan Law Journal, 1: xxxix, 1978.
- "Establishing a Prima Facie Case and Establishing a Case Beyond Reasonable Doubt", Malayan Law Journal, 1: xxxiii, 1982.
- "The Constitutional Right of Access to Counsel", Singapore Law Gazette, August 2002, archived from the original on 11 January 2005.
- "Handcuffs and the Law", Singapore Law Gazette, October 2002, archived from the original on 1 January 2006.
- "The Constitution and the Criminal Procedure Code", Singapore Law Gazette, December 2002, archived from the original on 7 September 2005.
- "The Death Sentence: Court's Judgment or Legislature's Sentence", Singapore Law Gazette, February 2003, archived from the original on 9 September 2007.
- "The Constitutional Right of Silence: Abridged?", Singapore Law Gazette, May 2003, archived from the original on 23 January 2005.
- "The Unconstitutional Punishment", Singapore Law Gazette, August 2003, archived from the original on 21 December 2007.
- "The Unconstitutional Punishment", Malayan Law Journal, 3: cxlviii, 2003.
- "Discovery and Fair Trials", Singapore Law Gazette, November 2003, archived from the original on 16 January 2005.
- "Composition and Due Process", Singapore Law Gazette, January 2004, archived from the original on 25 January 2005.
- "Evidence Act Section 147(3): Legislation or Legislative Interference?", Singapore Law Gazette, May 2004, archived from the original on 18 September 2004.
- "Admissions and Confessions", Singapore Law Gazette, October 2004, archived from the original on 1 January 2006.
- "The Mandatory Death Sentence", Singapore Law Gazette, April 2005, archived from the original on 17 April 2008.
- "Access: Rights and Duties", Singapore Law Gazette, July 2005, archived from the original on 20 July 2011.
- "The Right to Discovery in Criminal Proceedings", Singapore Law Gazette, September 2005, archived from the original on 20 July 2011.
- "Division of Matrimonial Assets in 'Big Money' Cases", Singapore Law Gazette, October 2005, archived from the original on 20 July 2011.
- "Appeal or Tried Again?", Singapore Law Gazette, January 2006, archived from the original on 20 July 2011.
- "The Court of Appeal: Wounded Murder Decisions?", Singapore Law Gazette, September 2006, archived from the original on 20 July 2011.
- "Practice in the 60's: Down Memory Lane", Singapore Law Gazette, October 2007, archived from the original on 20 July 2011.
- "The Hour of Criminal Legal Aid", Singapore Law Gazette, August 2008, archived from the original on 20 July 2011.
- "En Bloc Sales: Tyranny of the Majority", Singapore Law Gazette, March 2009, archived from the original on 20 July 2011.
- K. S. Rajah (2009), "Negotiating Boundaries: OB Markers and the Law", in Welsh, Bridget; et al. (eds.), Impressions of the Goh Chok Tong Years in Singapore, Singapore: NUS Press; Lee Kuan Yew School of Public Policy, National University of Singapore; Institute of Policy Studies, ISBN 9789971694098, (hbk.), ISBN 978-9971-69-396-1 (pbk.).

=== Books ===
- Legal Aid: The Legal Aid in Singapore [paper delivered at the Law Association for Asia and the Western Pacific, 3rd Conference, Jakarta, 16–19 July 1973], Jakarta: Conference Organizing Committee?, 1973, OCLC 22672018.
- Drug Problems in Adolescents [SANA occasional papers; 3], Singapore: Singapore Anti-Narcotics Association, 1979, OCLC 226024961.
