= Peter Maxwell =

Peter Maxwell may refer to:

- Peter Maxwell (director) (1921–2013), British, later Australian, director and screenwriter of television and film
- Peter Maxwell, 27th Baron de Ros (born 1958)
- Peter Maxwell, Lord Maxwell (1919–1994), Scottish lawyer and judge
- Peter Benson Maxwell (1817–1893), British colonial judge and legal writer
