= Ralph Rice =

British barrister and senior colonial judge (1781-1850)

Sir Ralph Rice

3rd Recorder of Prince of Wales Island (today Penang)
- In office 1817–1824
- Preceded by: George Andrew Cooper
- Succeeded by: Sir Francis Souper Bayley

Personal details
- Born: 1781
- Died: 3 July 1850 (aged 68–69) Brighton
- Spouse: Anne Bourke
- Education: Oriel College, Oxford
- Occupation: Barrister and senior colonial judge

Sir Ralph Rice (1781 – 3 July 1850) was a British barrister and senior colonial judge who served in the Straits Settlements and India in the early 19th century.

== Early life and education ==
Rice was born in 1781, the fifth son of John Rice, the family having been long established at Myddfai, Carmarthenshire. He graduated with BA from Oriel College, Oxford in 1802, was a student of the Inner Temple, and was called to the bar in 1805.

== Career ==
After becoming a barrister, Rice went on the western circuit. In 1817, he was appointed Recorder of Prince of Wales Island (today Penang) where the legal history of Malaya is said to have begun on the establishment of the Court of Judicature under the grant of a Charter of Justice in 1807. He was knighted on the occasion of his appointment and served until 1824.

On 27 October 1824, he was sworn in as a puisne judge of the Supreme Court of Bombay where he served for three years before resigning in November 1827. He left India on 27 November 1827 and returned to England.

== Personal life and death ==
In 1809, Rice married Anne Bourke who died in 1816. He died on 3 July 1850 at Brighton, aged 69.

== Honours ==
Rice was created a Knight Bachelor in 1817.
