= Clarridge =

Clarridge is a surname. Notable people with the surname include:

- Duane Clarridge (1932–2016), American CIA officer
- William Clarridge (fl. 19th century), British photographer

== See also ==
- Claridge (surname)
