= List of recorders of Penang, Singapore, and Malacca =

This is a list of the recorders of the British colonies of Penang (also known as Prince of Wales Island), Malacca, and Singapore between 1808 and 1867.

The position of recorder of Penang's Court of Judicature was established concurrently with the Court of Judicature by the Charter of Justice, created by letters patent dated 25 March 1807. The court opened on 31 May 1808. The recorder presided over the Court of Judicature.

On 27 November 1826, a unified court of judicature for Prince of Wales Island, Singapore, and Malacca was created, pursuant to the Second Charter of Justice, for which John Thomas Claridge was the first recorder. The unified court extended the jurisdiction of the original court of judicature for Penang to Singapore and Malacca.

Under the Second Charter, the recorder's office was in Penang and he was to go on circuit to courts of the other colonies. Recorders typically received higher salaries than British colonial governors in the Straits Settlements and were also knighted, apparently as a matter of course, upon their appointment. This led to some discord between the governors and the recorders, who were both members of the colonial courts.

From 1867 the position of recorder was replaced by the chief justice of the Straits Settlements.

== Recorders of Penang ==
- 1808–1816 Sir Edmond Stanley
- 1817 Sir George Andrew Cooper
- 1817–1824 Sir Ralph Rice
- 1824 Sir Francis Souper Bayley
- 1856–1866 Sir Peter Benson Maxwell
- 1866–1867 Sir William Hackett

== Recorders of Penang, Singapore, Malacca ==
- 1827–1829 Sir John Thomas Claridge
- 1833–1835 Sir Benjamin Heath Malkin
- 1835–1836 Sir Edward John Gambier
- 1836–1847 Sir William Norris
- 1847–1850 Sir Christopher Rawlinson
- 1850–1855 Sir William Jeffcott

== Recorders of Singapore, Malacca ==
- 1856–1866 Sir Richard Bolton McCausland
- 1866–1867 Sir Peter Benson Maxwell

== Recorder of Singapore ==
- 1866–1867 Sir Peter Benson Maxwell

== Sources ==
- Kyshe, J.W. Norton (1969). "A Judicial History of the Straits Settlements 1786–1890". Malaya Law Review. 11 (1): 38–180. ISSN 0542-335X. JSTOR 24863504.
- Tan, Kevin YL (2010). "International Law in the Courts of the Straits Settlements". Asian Yearbook of International Law. Vol. 16. Brill. pp. 65–86. doi:10.1163/9789004379695_004. ISBN 978-90-04-37968-8.
- Turnbull, C. M (1972). The Straits Settlements, 1826–67: Indian Presidency to Crown Colony. Athlone Press. ISBN 9780485131321. OCLC 1151320674.
