= Claridge Hotel =

Claridge Hotel may refer to:

in Argentina

- Claridge Hotel, Buenos Aires

in India

- The Claridges, New Delhi

in the United Kingdom

- Claridge's, London

in the United States

- Casa Faena, hotel in Miami Beach, Florida, formerly known as the Claridge Hotel
- Claridge Atlantic City, New Jersey
- Hotel Claridge, formerly in Times Square, New York City
