= George Claridge =

English cricketer

Personal information
- Born: 21 May 1794; Sevenoaks, Kent
- Died: 27 August 1856 (aged 62); Sevenoaks, Kent
- Relatives: John Thomas Claridge (brother)

Domestic team information
- Years: Team
- 1818–1828: Hampshire
- 1827–1829: Kent

George Claridge (21 May 1794 – 27 August 1856) was an English lawyer who played in the early 19th century.

Claridge was born at Sevenoaks in Kent in 1794, the son of John Fellowes Claridge and his wife Ann (née Swayne). His father was a solicitor in the town and, after being educated at Harrow School, Claridge followed his father into the law, practising in Sevenoaks from 1815 until his death in 1841. Claridge's brother, John Thomas Claridge, was at Harrow at the same time and was a contemporary and school friend of Lord Byron. He was a barrister at the Middle Temple, knighted in 1825 and served as the first Recorder of Prince of Wales Island, an area of the Straits Settlements covering Penang, Singapore and Malacca.

Claridge played club cricket for variety of teams in London and Kent. He played for Gentlemen of West Kent in 1815 and for Prince's Plain Club and the West Kent Cricket Club, living in Chislehurst where the Prince's Plain Club moved to in 1821. He made his important debut in 1818 for Hampshire against Marylebone Cricket Club (MCC) at Lord's and played for a variety of clubs, including the Gentlemen of Kent in the period until 1827. Between then and 1829 he played in nine more important matches, eight for Kent and a further match for Hampshire. Claridge generally played as a wicket-keeper and in his 10 important matches scored a total of 68 runs, with a highest score of 12.

In later life Claridge used a wheelchair as a result of partial paralysis, but continued to organise and attend cricket matches, particularly at Sevenoaks Vine. He lived in London for a time, with a residence on Great Marlborough Street in 1841, but owned property at Godden Green near Sevenoaks. He married Fanny Chambers in 1846. Claridge died at Sevenoaks in 1856 aged 62.

== Bibliography ==
- Carlaw, Derek (2020). Kent County Cricketers, A to Z: Part One (1806–1914) (PDF). Cardiff: ACS.
- Haygarth, Arthur (1996) [1862]. Scores & Biographies, Volume 1 (1744–1826). Kennington: Frederick Lillywhite. ISBN 978-19-00592-23-9.
- Haygarth, Arthur (1997) [1862]. Scores & Biographies, Volume 2 (1827–1840). Kennington: Frederick Lillywhite. ISBN 978-19-00592-23-9.
