= Edward John Gambier =

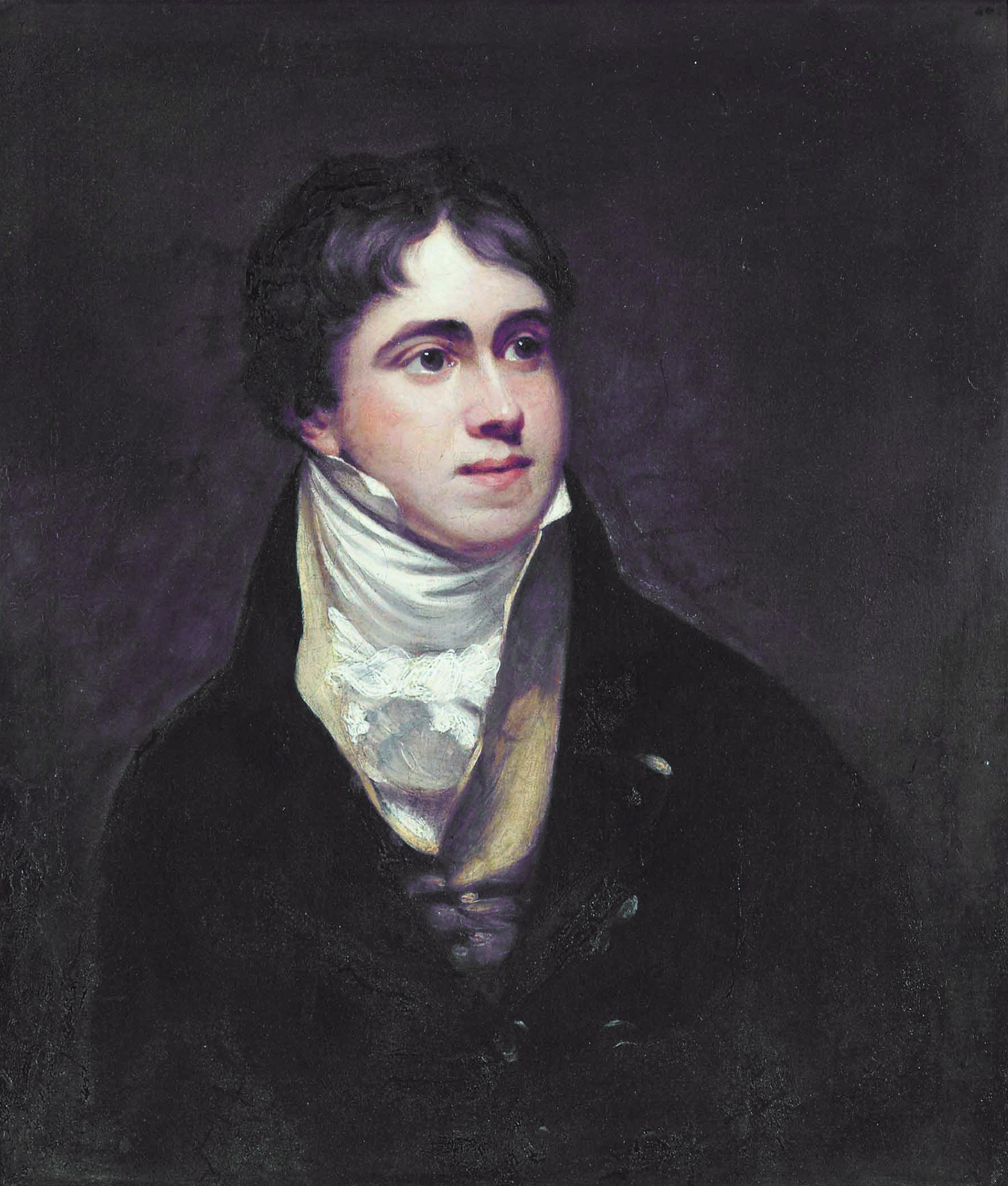
Edward Gambier (William Beechey)

Sir Edward John Gambier (1794–1879) was a colonial jurist and law officer, who served as a judge in British India, Chief Justice of Madras and Recorder of Penang, Singapore, Malacca.

== Early life ==
Gambier was born in 1794. He was the third son of Sir Samuel Gambier, first commissioner of the navy (1752–1813), and Jane Mathew, the youngest daughter of Daniel Mathew of Felix Hall, Essex. He was also the nephew of Admiral James Gambier, 1st Baron Gambier.

He entered Eton College in 1808, then went up to Trinity College, Cambridge, where he took his bachelor's degree in 1817. He was the first President of the Cambridge Union and was awarded ninth senior optime and junior chancellor's medallist. He proceeded to earn his M.A. in 1820 and became a fellow of his college.

== Career ==
Gambier was called to the bar at Lincoln's Inn 7 February 1822 and acted as one of the municipal corporation commissioners in 1833. The recordership of Prince of Wales Island was conferred on him in 1834 and he was knighted by King William IV at St. James's Palace on 6 August of that year.

He was removed to Madras 28 November 1836 as a puisne judge of the supreme court, and raised to the chief justiceship there 11 March 1842, being sworn in on 22 May. The duties of this high post he discharged with ability and efficiency until his retirement in 1849, when he received from the Hindu community of Madras a testimonial consisting of a silver centre-piece weighing 550 ounces, and Lady Gambier was at the same time presented with a handsome tripod centrepiece by the European ladies of Madras.

A Treatise on Parochial Settlement, which he published in 1828, went to a second edition under the editorship of J. Greenwood in 1835.

== Personal life ==
In 1828 Gambier married Emilia Ora Morgell, daughter of C. Morgell, M.P.

His wife died on 25 February 1877. He died at 22 Hyde Park Gate, Kensington, London, 31 May 1879, in his eighty-sixth year.
