= Manuela Kasper-Claridge =

German journalist

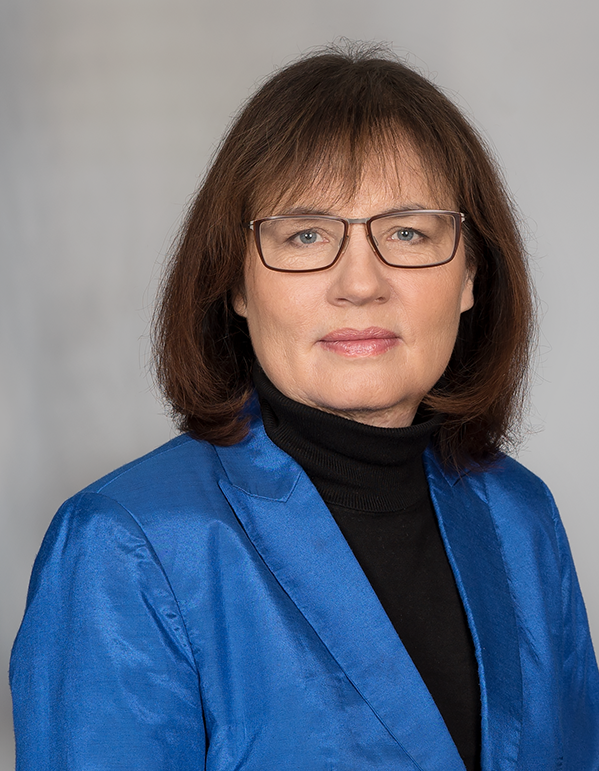
Manuela Kasper-Claridge, DW editor-in-chief

Manuela Kasper-Claridge (born 26 October 1959 in Berlin) is a German journalist.

She is the editor-in-chief of Germany's international broadcaster Deutsche Welle (DW) with around 3,000 employees and freelancers from 60 countries.

== Early life and career ==
Manuela Kasper-Claridge studied Economics and Sociology at the Freie Universität Berlin and graduated in 1984. From 1985 to 1986 she completed an internship at West Berlin's public radio and television service SFB (today RBB). Later she trained TV news producers and directors.

Between 1988 and 1992, she worked as a news producer for RIAS-TV, covering Germany's Reunification, Central and Eastern European affairs. She also reported from Washington, D.C.

Kasper-Claridge has three children and lives in Berlin.

== Career at DW ==
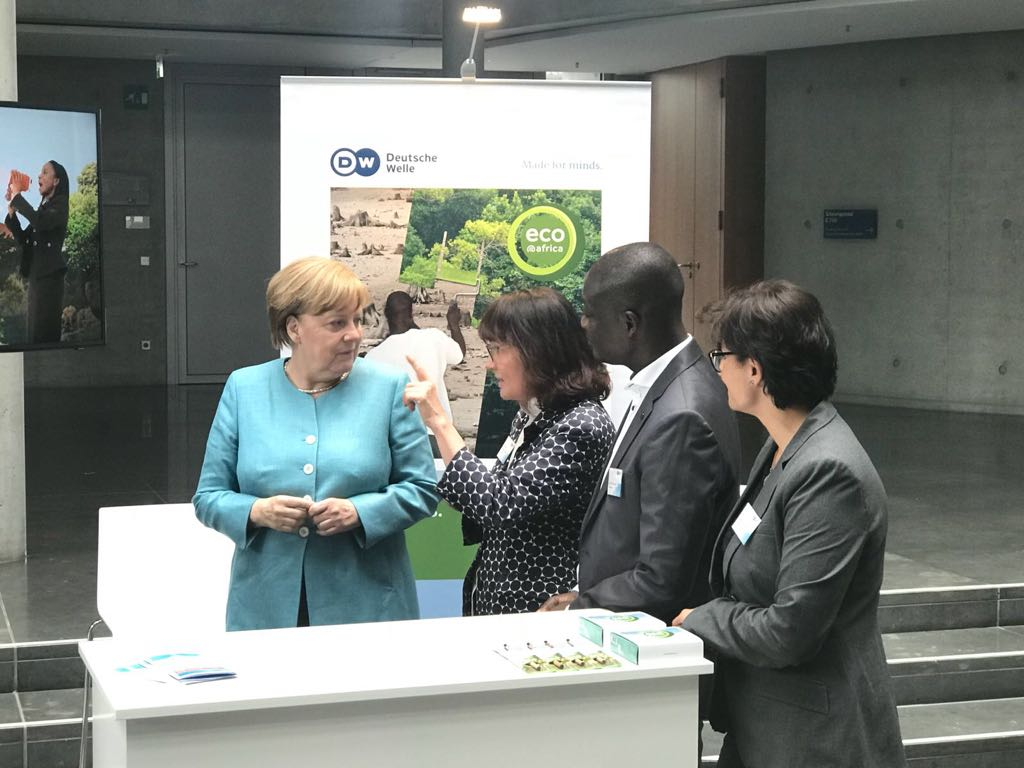
With German Chancellor Angela Merkel at DW's 65th anniversary celebration.

Kasper-Claridge joined DW in 1992 as a reporter and producer for reports and documentaries covering Europe, the US and Asia. In 1998, she became head of DW's Business department, which she expanded in 2001 to include Science and again in 2014 to become Business, Science and Environment.

On 1 May 2020 Kasper-Claridge was appointed as DW's editor-in-chief. That same month she launched a new diversity initiative, the Editor-in-Chief's Council, bringing colleagues from multiple backgrounds together to advise her and support DW's work.

She oversaw the creation of a new multilingual format COVID-19 Special at the beginning of the coronavirus pandemic, which focused on scientific, societal and economic effects of the global health crisis.

During Germany's federal elections in 2021 she conducted interviews with now German Chancellor Olaf Scholz and current Finance Minister Christian Lindner.

As editor-in-chief she has also been invited to host and speak at numerous international events including the World Economic Forum in Davos and Women Political Leaders in Reykjavik.

== Projects and cooperations ==
In 2009 Kasper-Claridge started Global Ideas, a multimedia-based climate project for Deutsche Welle which is available in 5 different languages.

Kasper-Claridge has regularly attends the World Economic Forum in Davos, where she has previously initiated partnerships with the WEF and the Schwab Foundation. She is also a member of the German Chambers of Industry and Commerce's (DIHK) committee on media and communication and is on the board of trustees of Germany's Ifo institute.

She started a cooperation with the Lindau Nobel Laureate Meetings and interviewed various Nobel laureates like Stephen Chu (physics), Mario Molina (chemistry), Barry Marshall (medicine) and Alvin Roth (economy).

Over the past few years, Kasper-Claridge has regularly joined the Fortune conference "Most Powerful Women" in London, which brings together the most prominent European women leaders in business, along with selected leaders from government, media, philanthropy and the arts.

Since June 2016 she has been a member of the board of the Hamburg World Economic Institute association “Gesellschaft der Freunde und Förderer des HWWI gGmbH e.V.”.

== Awards ==
Manuela Kasper-Claridge has won multiple awards as an executive producer during her time as head of DW's Business, Science and Environment department and as editor-in-chief.

Among those awards are "Best in Documentaries" at the World Media Festival and gold at the New York Festivals TV & Film Awards in 2021 for the documentary "The Price of Poverty" in DW's Founders' Valley series.

The YouTube format "Planet A" won gold at the World Media Festival 2021, the Deauville Green Awards 2021 and the One World Media Awards in 2022.

The news format "Covid-19 Special" won 3rd place in the category "Best Coverage of Continuing News Story" at the New York Festivals TV & Film Awards 2021.

She was also awarded the online environment reporting prize by Environmental Action Germany (DUH) for DW's multimedia project "Global Ideas".
