= Claridge, Pennsylvania =

Unincorporated community in Pennsylvania, US

- Unincorporated community
- Location within Pennsylvania
- Coordinates: 40°21′56″N 79°37′20″W
- Country: United States
- State: Pennsylvania
- County: Westmoreland
- Elevation: 1,056 ft (322 m)
- Time zone: UTC-5 (Eastern (EST))
  - Summer (DST): UTC-4 (EDT)
- ZIP code: 15623
- Area code: 724
- GNIS feature ID: 1171900

Claridge is an unincorporated community in Westmoreland County, Pennsylvania, United States. The community is 3.3 miles (5.3 km) northeast of Manor. Claridge has a post office with ZIP code 15623, which opened on January 25, 1886.
