= Diane Claridge =

Bahamian mammologist (born 1963)

- Born: 1 November 1963 (age 62); Nassau, The Bahamas
- Education: Florida Institute of Technology (BSc); University of Aberdeen (MSc); University of St Andrews (PhD)
- Scientific career
- Fields: Zoology, mammalogy, marine bioacoustics and environmental science
- Institutions: Bahamas Marine Mammal Research Organization; Friends of the Environment in Abaco
- Thesis: Population ecology of Blainville's beaked whales (Mesoplodon densirostris) (2013)
- Doctoral advisor: Phil Hammond; John W. Durban

Diane Elaine Claridge (born 1 November 1963) is a Bahamian mammalogist most known for her work on beaked whales. She founded the Bahamas Marine Mammal Research Organization and is a director of Friends of the Environment in Abaco.

== Biography ==
Claridge was born in Nassau in The Bahamas.

Claridge studied a bachelor's degree in environmental science at the Florida Institute of Technology in Melbourne, Florida, United States. She completed an overseas research degree to complete a master's degree in zoology from the University of Aberdeen in Aberdeen, Scotland. She studied a PhD in biology at St. Andrews University in St Andrews, Fife, Scotland, focusing on the spatial processes in the population ecology of beaked whales.

In 1991, Claridge founded the Bahamas Marine Mammal Research Organization, based in Marsh Harbour, Abaco Islands, which she co-directs with Ken Balcomb and is supported by Earthwatch.

In 2000, Claridge found a deceased dense-beaked whale in a lagoon at Cross Harbour Creek, Abaco, which was subsequently studied in a post-mortem in Boston, Massachusetts, United States.

By 2005, Claridge and her research team of Earthwatch volunteers had documented the presence of twenty-three species of marine mammals, including beaked whales, bottlenose dolphins, hooded seals, manatees and toothed whales, for the Bahamas Marine Mammal Survey (BMMS).

Claridge contributed photography and behavioural observations of Blainville's beaked whales to the Encyclopedia of Marine Mammals (2009). Her research into mammal behaviour and marine bioacoustics has enabled the development of understanding about why Blainville's beaked whales are particularly susceptible to naval sonar. She has also contributed research to genomics and morphology work, which helped to reveal a new species of beaked whale.

Claridge is a director of Friends of the Environment in Abaco.
