= Simon Claridge =

British painter

- Born: 19 February 1980 (age 46); Edinburgh, Scotland
- Education: Fine Art, University of Reading, Berkshire
- Known for: Painting, silkscreen
- Movement: Contemporary
- Website: www.simonclaridge.com

Simon Claridge (born 1980) is a British contemporary artist known primarily for his use of diamond dust in his paintings of iconic women of the 20th and 21st century, such as Marilyn Monroe, Audrey Hepburn and Debbie Harry. In 2002 Claridge graduated from the University of Reading with a degree in Fine Art before working at an art gallery in Windsor, United Kingdom whilst he developed his artistic practice. In 2005 Birmingham-based art publishers Washington Green Fine Art offered Claridge a contract, in which his limited edition artwork would be sold in galleries across the United Kingdom. Collectors of Claridge's work include musician Rod Stewart, celebrity stylist Rachel Zoe and Formula One racing driver David Coulthard.

Simon Claridge lives in Winchester, United Kingdom.

== Style ==
Claridge is known for his black and white portraits of iconic women of stage and screen, though in 2015 Claridge exhibited a collection which also featured Elvis Presley and John Lennon. Typically employing the silkscreen technique, Claridge also frequently uses diamond dust, a form of glitter derived from diamonds and glass.

== Notable projects ==
=== Henry Holland for Cancer Research UK (2011) ===
Claridge created a portrait of model Kate Moss, which was included in Henry Holland's debut exhibition and auction in aid of Cancer Research UK. The painting, signed by artist and model fetched over £3,000 for the cause.

=== Alfa Romeo (2013) ===
Car brand Alfa Romeo commissioned Claridge to create murals across car parking spaces near Oxford Street, London. The murals featured portraits of Kate Moss, Marilyn Monroe, James Dean and David Bowie in Claridge's signature style.

=== Twentieth Century Fox (2013–2015) ===
In a project which reportedly took two years to complete, Claridge was given unprecedented access to the film archives of Twentieth Century Fox in a partnership which saw him create Marilyn six original paintings of Marilyn Monroe based on stills and photographs owned by Twentieth Century Fox. The six were manufactured as signed limited edition artworks and displayed in galleries around the United Kingdom.

=== Playboy (2014–2016) ===
This art collection from Claridge launched at the Playboy Club in Mayfair on Thursday 14 January 2016. It follows Playboy's diamond anniversary in 2013 and is a collection of six vintage magazine covers spanning three decades of the iconic magazine. Claridge was, again, given unprecedented access to the archives, finally selecting six images from around seven hundred covers, dating from 1967 to 1982, including Playboy Bunnies, Karen Christy and Kaya Christian. All of the images are painted in Claridge's signature monochrome style and are embellished with diamond dust.

=== Brigitte Bardot (2016) ===
The Brigitte Bardot collection represents his continued celebration of iconic female beauty. Claridge states that, to him, Bardot "defines beauty" and, indeed, was one of the first females to make an impression on him. Bardot's look and style is still current today and is emulated by some of the biggest names in fashion. These limited edition pieces segue beautifully from both his previous collections and, displayed alongside each other, form a visual homage to the greatest female trailblazers in popular culture.

=== Terry O'Neill (2017) ===
In his latest collection of limited edition diamond dust silkscreen prints, Simon Claridge has taken iconic images from the hallowed archives of legendary English photographer Terry O'Neill. In a career spanning more than half a century, O'Neill pioneered the iconic celebrity portrait and became famed for his instinct and ability to capture his subjects in candid, and sometimes unorthodox, poses and locations. Also an accomplished photographer himself, Claridge has long admired the work of Terry O'Neill. For that admiration now to be mutual is a source of great pride for him. Putting paid to the common misconception that one must never meet their heroes for fear of them not living up to expectations, Claridge describes the collaboration as "a meeting of minds" between two fellow artists, each with an appreciation for the other's style.
