= Claridge Hotel, Buenos Aires =

Coordinates: 34.60041939°S 58.3745287°W

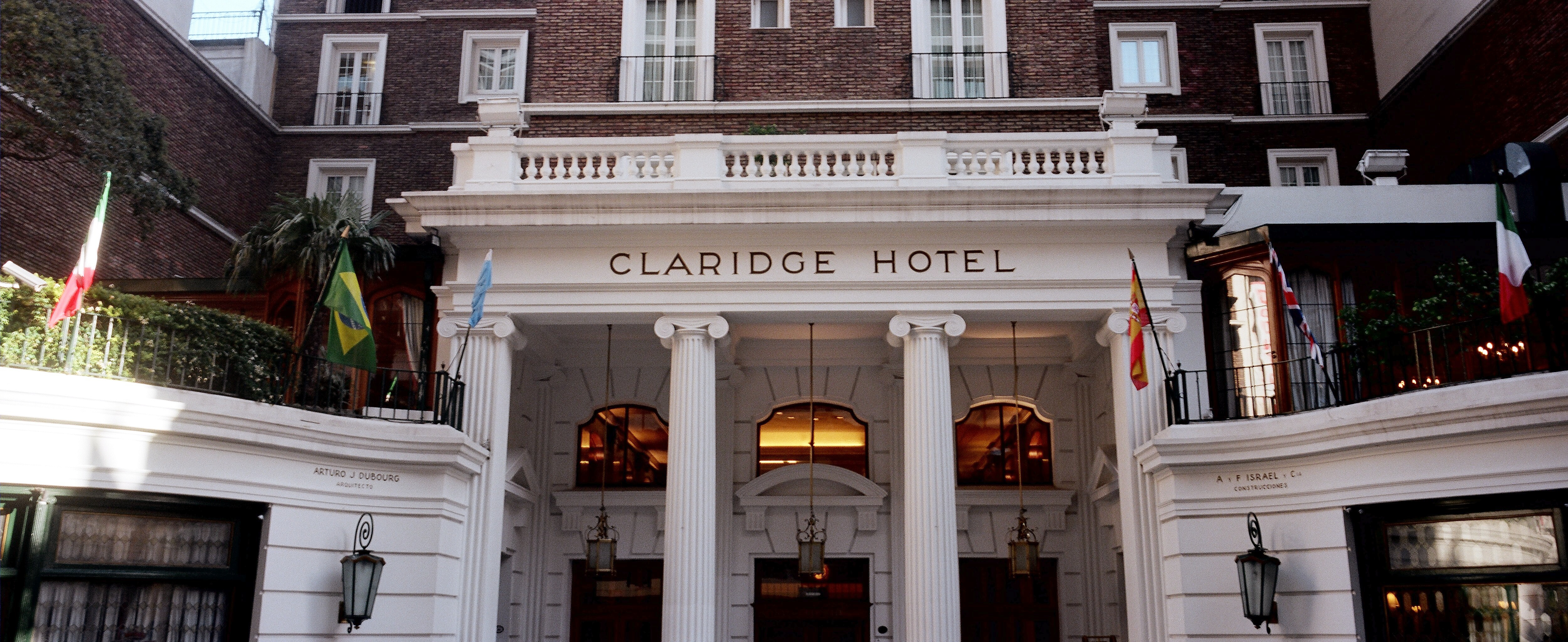
Claridge Hotel entrance.

The Claridge Hotel is a five-star hotel in the city of Buenos Aires, Argentina.

Established in 1946, it was designed by architect Arturo Dubourg (es). It is operated by Eurostars Hotels.
