= Family law of Singapore =

The Family law of Singapore deals with several family legal issues in Singapore. It deals with adoptions, divorce, children's issues, division of matrimonial property, personal protection orders, probate and maintenance. The family court in Singapore oversees these legal issues. Singapore has two separate and different sets of family law: one for Muslims and the other for everyone else. Family law for Muslims is codified in the Administration of Muslim Law Act (AMLA). Family law for non-Muslims is codified in the Women's Charter. The Family Justice Courts of Singapore (FJC) handles all family cases.

== Divorce ==
Before a divorce can be granted or considered, the grounds for divorce must be established. The recognised grounds are adultery, desertion and unreasonable behaviour. In addition, one party to the marriage has to be domiciled in Singapore or to have been staying there for 3 years before one can file for a divorce in Singapore. This applies to both Singapore citizens or foreigners.

To apply for a divorce, one has to file a writ for divorce, statement of particulars and statement of claim. The reasons for divorce are established in the statement of claim. It is possible to proceed with the divorce proceedings in Singapore without engaging a divorce lawyer. However, the Family Court is not in the position to offer one any advice in this case.

Once divorce commences, any forms of disputes raised by the defendant will result in the case being referred to a marriage counsellor. If counselling fails, the involved parties will have to file affidavits of evidence and the judge will then determine if the case will proceed as contested or uncontested divorce. At this point, the judge will pass an interim judgement with a 3 months waiting period. This is to give the involved parties one last chance of reconciliation. When that does not happen, the ancillary process will start.

Finally, when the judge deems that the marriage has broken down irretrievably, he will grant the divorce. Only after 3 months from the final decision, then both parties are free to remarry. f

On 1 July 2024, Singapore introduced a new sixth ground for divorce, "Divorce by Mutual Agreement." Previously, there were only five grounds for divorce. This new ground allows couples to cite mutual agreement in divorce applications, enabling them to divorce without attributing fault to either party, reducing acrimony in the process.

To establish irretrievable breakdown the divorce applicant has to prove one of the following scenarios:

- Adultery.
- Unreasonable behaviour.
- Desertion for 2 years.
- Separation for 3 years (and the defendant consents to a divorce).
- Separation for 4 years.
- Divorce by Mutual Agreement.

== Probate ==
Probate is the process of proving and registering the last will or testament of a deceased person in the Family Justice Courts. This legal document expresses the deceased person wishes as to how their property is to be distributed and names an executor who administers the deceased's estate and handles the disposal of their assets and debts. The executor gets this authority by applying to court to obtain a legal document called Grant of Probate.

If a deceased person did not make a Will, then the family members need to apply for Letter of Administration. The person who will an apply is commonly but not always the surviving spouse or eldest child of the deceased. In this case, the assets are distributed according to the Intestate Succession Act.

== Adoption ==
Adoption is a legal process, governed under the Adoption of Children Act (ACA) and the Family Court of Singapore is the authority that decides on adoption applications. The Singapore Adoption of Children Act states:

- The parents must be older than 25 years old and at least 21 years older than the adoption child.
- Adoptive parent must not be more than 50 years older than the child.
- Parent should have sound mental health.
- The child must be under 21 years old and a Singapore resident. A foreign-born child may be adopted, but will need to get a Dependant's Pass from the Ministry of Social and Family Development (MSF).
- Both married couples and singles can adopt a child. However, a single male is not allowed to adopt a girl unless special circumstances exist.
- Parents must be Singaporean citizens or permanent residents, or hold passes which the Family Justice Courts deem fit to qualify them as residents in Singapore.

These rules may be waived if special circumstances justify the adoption.
