= John Thomas Claridge =

British barrister

Sir John Thomas Claridge (bapt. 1 February 1792 – 20 June 1868) was a British barrister who served as Recorder for the Straits Settlements in what is now Malaysia from 1825 to 1829. Claridge was recalled from his post after a well-publicised bitter quarrel with the East India Company. He was later involved in a public scandal regarding the will for a wealthy estate.

== Early life ==
John Claridge was born in 1792, into a middle-class family in Sevenoaks, Kent in England. He was the son of John Fellowes Claridge, a solicitor and partner in a law firm with Francis Austen, a great-uncle of Jane Austen. His younger brother, George Claridge (1794–1856), was a solicitor who practised in the family firm in Sevenoaks and a famous amateur cricketer.

== Harrow School and Lord Byron ==
Claridge started attending Harrow School in 1805. While at Harrow, Claridge became friends with Lord Byron and his small circle of friends. Although Byron left Harrow in 1805, he continued to visit there regularly, staying with Henry Drury who shared rooms with Claridge. Over a dozen letters from Claridge to Byron survive in the John Murray Archive and cover a period from 1808 to 1811. The letters strongly hint that Byron exerted a powerful attraction on Claridge, who expresses his love for Byron in unequivocal terms.

Claridge stayed at Newstead over Easter 1809. He attended a party in which Byron and his friends John Hobhouse, Scrope Berdmore Davies, Charles Skinner Matthews and James Wedderburn Webster dressed up as monks. The men drank from a skull and consorted with "Paphian girls", played by female servants. Byron refers to this party in the canto 1 of Childe Harold's Pilgrimage, stating "Now Paphian girls were known to sing and smile/And monks might deem their time was come agen".

After returning from Greece in 1811, Byron renewed his friendship with Claridge. However, after a month of his company, Byron became rapidly bored. Byron wrote in September that year:

…Jn Claridge is here, improved in person a good deal, & amiable, but not amusing, now here is a good man, a handsome man, an honourable man, a most inoffensive man, a well informed man, and a dull man, & this last damned epithet undoes all the rest; … my old friend with the soul of honour & the zeal of friendship & a vast variety of insipid virtues, can't keep me or himself awake.

— George Gordon, Lord Byron, Letter to John Hobhouse, October 1811, Byron's Letters & Journals 'Famous in My Time': 1810-1812

In letters to Hobhouse that autumn, Byron execrates Claridge's dullness, fending off a claim of an "attachment" to the youth and eventually dismisses him with "Claridge is gone". Claridge's letters stop and Byron never refers to him again in his letters or journals.

== Early career ==
Claridge graduated from Christ Church, Oxford in 1813 and was called to the Bar at the Middle Temple in 1818. However, there is no evidence of Claridge's work as a barrister.

In 1825, the London Gazette reported:

Windsor Castle, Sept. 30. The King was this day pleased to confer the honour of knighthood on John Thomas Claridge, Esq. of the Middle Temple, Recorder of Prince of Wales' Island.

Claridge was then appointed to the position of recorder, a senior judgeship in the Straits Settlement . He may have obtained this post due to his friendship with the Duchess of Dorset, Prime Minister Lord Liverpool’s stepsister. The post provided a salary of £4,000 per year with a pension of £500 a year after five years. Further promotion seemed a certainty, as three out of four previous Recorders in the region had gained well-paid judgeships in India.

Soon after his appointment as recorder, Claridge married 25-year-old Mary Pinnock Scott, the eldest daughter of Vice-Admiral Scott. In spring 1827, Claridge, presumably with Lady Claridge, sailed for Prince of Wales’ Island, arriving in Penang in early August

== Recordership in Penang ==
The Straits Governor was Robert Fullerton, a Scotsman in his mid fifties who was long-standing employee of the East India Company. An 1826 Charter gave the Governor and the Residents equal roles with ‘a Recorder appointed in England, who was to be a Barrister of not less than Five Years Standing’.

Claridge felt that he ranked over the governor and residents because he was a representative of the British Governor. In addition, Claridge wanted to set up a fully separate and funded legal arm of government in Penang that was separate from the East India Company. However, neither the East India Company or the British Government supported his initiative due to its high cost.

Claridge's relationship with Fullerton broke down almost immediately.

A 1921 history of the settlement describes the accepted view of the confrontation:

…almost immediately there began between him and the Government ‘those mischievous discussions,’ as the Indian Law Commissioners later termed them, which eventually led to his recall and removal from office.

Expected to travel from Penang to Singapore and Malacca to administer justice, Claridge refused to go. He blamed Fullerton and the residents for failing to assume their share of judicial work. Claridge also complained about the lack of a ‘full, efficient and respectable court establishment of clerks, interpreters, etc.’. In addition, he asked for his staff’s salaries to be raised.

Another Claridge demand was steam ship transportation to Singapore and Malacca. He regarded it as a ‘direct insult’ when Fullterton refused this request, and ‘Great irascibility of temper (was) shown on both sides’. Claridge claimed that the President of the Board of Control promised him a steam ship when he was offered the recordership. The East India Company refused to pay for one, calling it a luxury. Claridge in turn refused to fund his transportation costs from his salary or expenses.

To break this impasse, Fullerton and the Singapore Resident, Kenneth Murchison, finally held assizes in Singapore themselves in May 1828. Claridge eventually travelled to Malacca, but by that point the East India Company was petitioning the British government to remove him from office.

== Recall to England ==
On 30 September 1828 the First Lord of the Admiralty, Lord Melville, wrote to the President of the Board of Control, Charles Williams-Wynn: the East India Company Court of Directors had asked King George IV to remove Claridge from his recordership. Fullerton was accusing Claridge of ‘extorting higher salaries for the Officers of his Court than the Government deemed proper, on the threat of refusing to administer justice’. An Order in Council letter was signed and sent in February 1829, recalling Claridge to England.

The letter reached Claridge in Malacca in August 1829. Claridge seems to have turned tail immediately and set off for China en route for England. A Calcutta newspaper quoted the British Government as saying that Claridge ‘is not, in point of fact, recalled, for no successor is appointed; he is merely directed to return’. This sentence is key to Claridge’s future: he was never dismissed, but more ambiguously directed to return to England.

Back in England in late 1831, Claridge defended himself against six charges at a hearing of the Privy Council. He was acquitted of all the charges except one. However, the government would not allow him to return to Penang.

== The case of the ‘Gloucester Miser’ ==
By 1835, Claridge was living in Plowden Buildings in the Middle Temple. It is unclear if he was practising formally as a barrister, but it was at this time that he re-emerges out of the shadows as a player in one of the most notorious legal cases of the era, that of the Gloucester Miser.

James or more popularly Jemmy Wood was the proprietor of one of the oldest private banks in the kingdom, probably the first commoner in England to become a millionaire and a noted miser. Charles Dickens is thought to have modelled Ebenezer Scrooge on him. The Chancery case following his death and disputed will may form the theme of ‘Bleak House’. Wood, who lived alone and had no close relatives, died in early 1834 and left an estate valued at £900,000, (around £40,000,000 today). A will naming Wood’s executors as his beneficiaries was submitted for probate, but then alternative wills appeared and a conspiracy was suspected. A £1,000 reward was offered for information about any earlier will. In 1836, at the height of the will controversy, ‘Thomas Leighton, Gent’, an attorney from Gloucester working in London, published a fifty-page pamphlet called ‘Extraordinary facts and circumstances relating to the last will and testament of the late James Wood’. Leighton had attempted to win the reward and, rebuffed, set out the full and complex case in his pamphlet.

Sir John Claridge was a business associate of Leighton’s employer, who advised him to take his case to the barrister. Leighton soon started to feel Claridge himself was part of a conspiracy. The knight’s behaviour inexplicably changed from rude and dismissive, to civil and agreeable, and back again. Claridge, though only comparatively briefly involved in the case, receives a storm of opprobrium.

This Sir John Thomas Claridge is a son of an Attorney deceased, who lived at Seven Oaks, in Kent, and who was knighted on being sent out as Recorder of Penang; … he petitioned the House of Commons, against the appointment of a party proposed by my Lord Glenelg…as he considered himself better entitled.

Claridge’s troubles, including implicitly his father’s suicide, the Recordership débâcle and his Commons petition to regain his post in 1835, were clearly known in legal circles. Leighton calls him someone capable of ‘genteel bullying’ and guilty of ‘dirty conduct’ and even employs poetry by the popular contemporary satirist, Peter Pindar, to characterize Sir John as a sinister eminence cooking ‘some rare dish of sin’:

‘The devil’s a fellow of such sterling humour/And all so civil in each act and look ’

== Decline and death ==
On 25 July 1848, Hansard reports two interesting speakers in a debate on Sir John Claridge’s right to be appointed to another colonial position. Claridge had spent many years trying to regain his right to a judge’s post and finally to be granted a pension and this was his last petition to Parliament. The opposing speakers were William Gladstone, Secretary of State for the Colonies in the previous Government, and Sir John Hobhouse. ‘Hobby’, Byron’s best friend and flame-bearer and Claridge’s erstwhile fellow guest at Newstead that Easter many years before, was now a member of the Government. From 1846 to 1852, he was President of the Board of Control, and in this role, played an inexplicably negative part in Claridge’s attempts to gain reparation.

Gladstone spoke for the motion, telling the Commons ‘that he had been guilty of no act which should incapacitate him from serving the Crown hereafter in a judicial capacity.’ Claridge wished to be appointed now as a judge in India. Hansard reports a dismissive Hobhouse response:

The appointment had taken place twenty years ago, and he had nothing to do with it, and had had nothing to do with the matter at all except having been so unfortunate as to have had a long and by no means agreeable correspondence with that gentleman…He had nothing to say against the character of Sir J. T. Claridge, but he would rather not make him a judge… He wished it was in his power to come to some other conclusion on the subject, and to be able to say that Sir J. T. Claridge was the fittest person to be appointed as judge in India or elsewhere; but he could not give such an answer.

The motion was withdrawn. Why was Hobhouse so openly and cruelly dismissive of his and Byron’s old friend? Letters to Hobhouse from Sir Frederic Thesiger, (Frederic Thesiger, 1st Baron Chelmsford) until recently the Attorney General, warmly pleaded his friend Claridge’s case, but they only seemed to rouse Hobhouse’s ire. Hobhouse, who had once pleaded Claridge’s decency and kindness to a dismissive Byron, (‘he wrote me a very kind letter, kind both to me and to you’), now disowned his former associate in the most public manner possible.

Without a legal practice or any pension, the Claridge household income declined so far that, in the 1851 census, his wife Mary is recorded as running a ‘scholastic establishment’ in Sidmouth with two 14-year-old local tradesmen's daughters living in. On 20 June 1868, the Claridges' arrival was reported in the Leamington Spa Courier, but he died the very same day. Claridge’s death certificate states he had died of ‘Apoplexy 10 weeks. Paralysis right side 3 days’ so a stroke is the most likely cause of death. He was buried at Leamington Priors Parish, All Saints, but there is no sign of his gravestone; it may have vanished due to headstone removals or perhaps Lady Claridge was unable to afford one. No will was registered and when in 1897 a great nephew applied for probate on the Claridges’ estate, Lady Claridge having died in 1888, it was worth just over £130.

There is a Byronic postscript. In 1857, Claridge, living from hand to mouth in genteel poverty, made a gift to his old school of a five volume set of the ‘Arabian Nights’. His inscription is roughly written across the frontispiece:

This copy of the ‘Arabian Nights’ was given to me when I was at Harrow School, nearly 60 years ago (sic), by George Gordon, Lord Byron, Author of ‘Childe Harold’

Tenderly, Claridge goes on to recall both his headmaster Butler and master Henry Drury as ‘friend’, but there is no such epithet attached to the giver of the gift, the man who had once been ‘my dearest Byron’.
