= Peter Benson Maxwell =

British colonial judge (1817–1893)

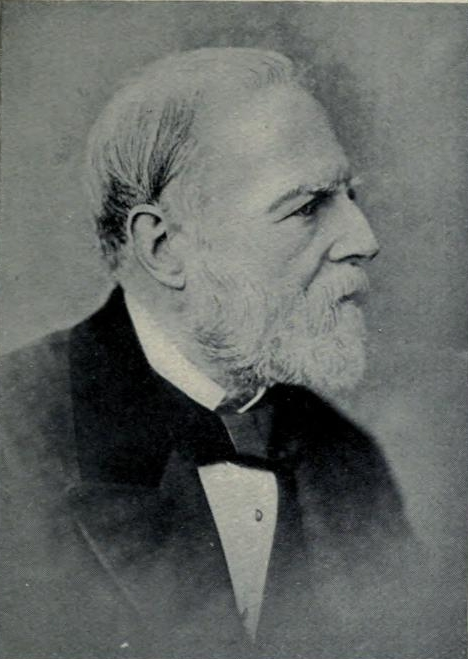
Maxwell circa 1921

Peter Benson Maxwell (31 January 1817 – 14 January 1893) was a colonial judge and legal writer.

Peter Benson Maxwell was born on 31 January 1817, the fourth son of Reverend Peter Benson Maxwell of Birdstown, County Donegal, Ireland. He attended Trinity College Dublin. He was called to the bar of the Middle Temple on 19 November 1841.

Maxwell was the recorder of Penang (then called Prince of Wales Island) from 1856 to 1866 and of Singapore from 1866 to 1871. He became the chief justice of the Straits Settlements in 1867, remaining in office until 1871.

His legal treatise, On the Interpretation of Statutes, was first published in 1875 and was in its 12th edition as of 1976. He also wrote a book titled The Duties of Police Magistrates (1871).

Maxwell was knighted on 30 January 1856. He died on 14 January 1893.
