= Philip C. Jessup International Law Moot Court Competition =

Major international moot competition

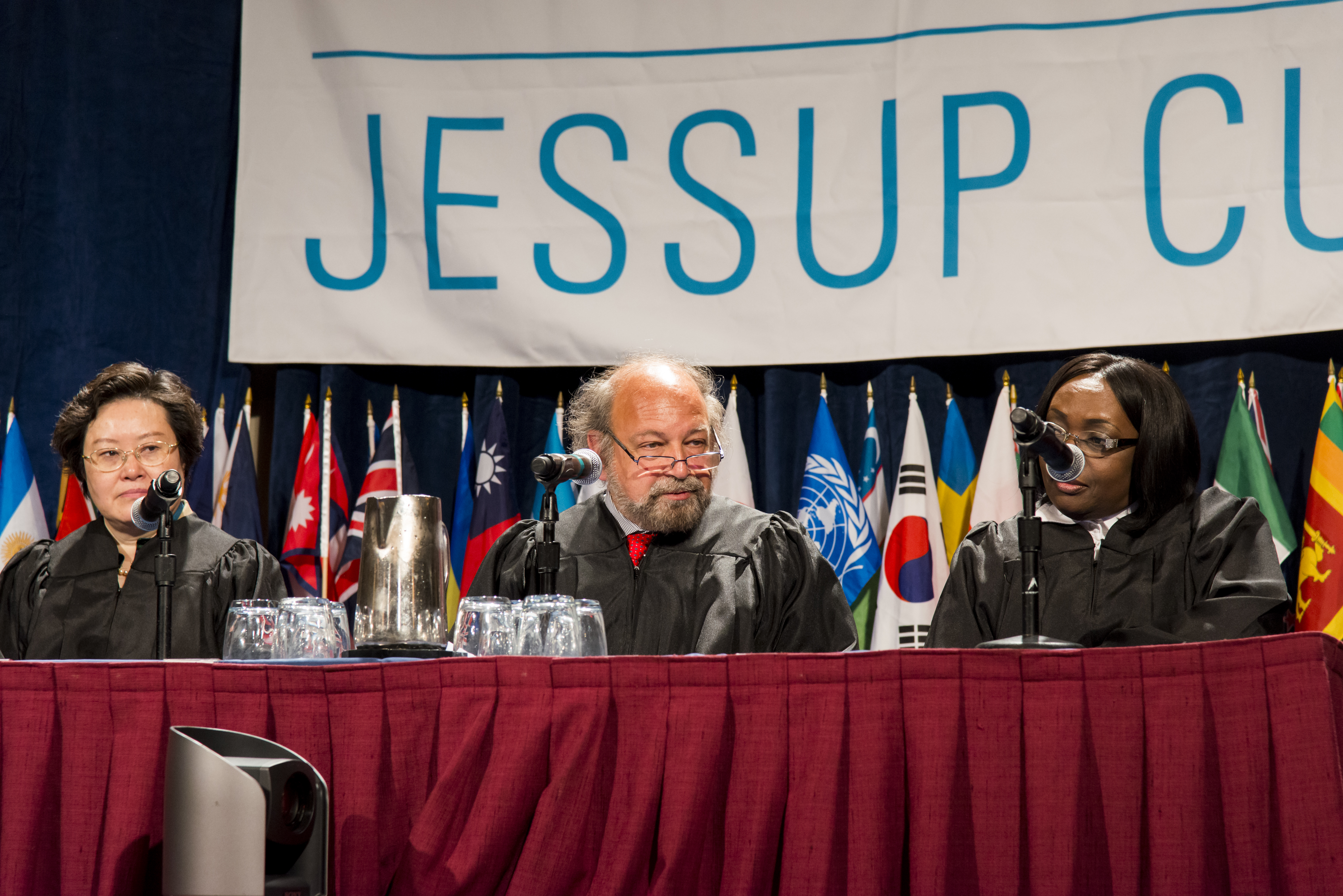
- International Court of Justice judges Xue Hanqin, Ronny Abraham, and Julia Sebutinde judging the 2013 international final
- Established: 1960 (1968 for international rounds)
- Venue: Typically Washington, D.C., U.S. (international rounds)
- Subject matter: Public international law
- Class: Grand Slam
- Record participation: 803 teams (2025)
- Qualification: National/regional rounds
- Most championships: University of Sydney (6; 1 online)
- Website: Official website

The Philip C. Jessup International Law Moot Court Competition, also known as the Jessup Moot or The Jessup, is the oldest and largest international moot competition in the world, with recent editions each attracting participants from more than 800 law schools in around 100 countries.

== Origins of the moot ==
The competition is a simulation of a fictional dispute between countries before the International Court of Justice (ICJ). It is named after Philip Jessup, who once served on the ICJ, and is organised by the International Law Students Association (ILSA). The moot, under the leadership of Stephen Schwebel (who also wrote the inaugural moot problem), started as a friendly advocacy competition between two teams from Harvard University in 1960. The first champions were declared in 1963 and the competition opened its doors to non-American teams in 1968.

== Moot format ==
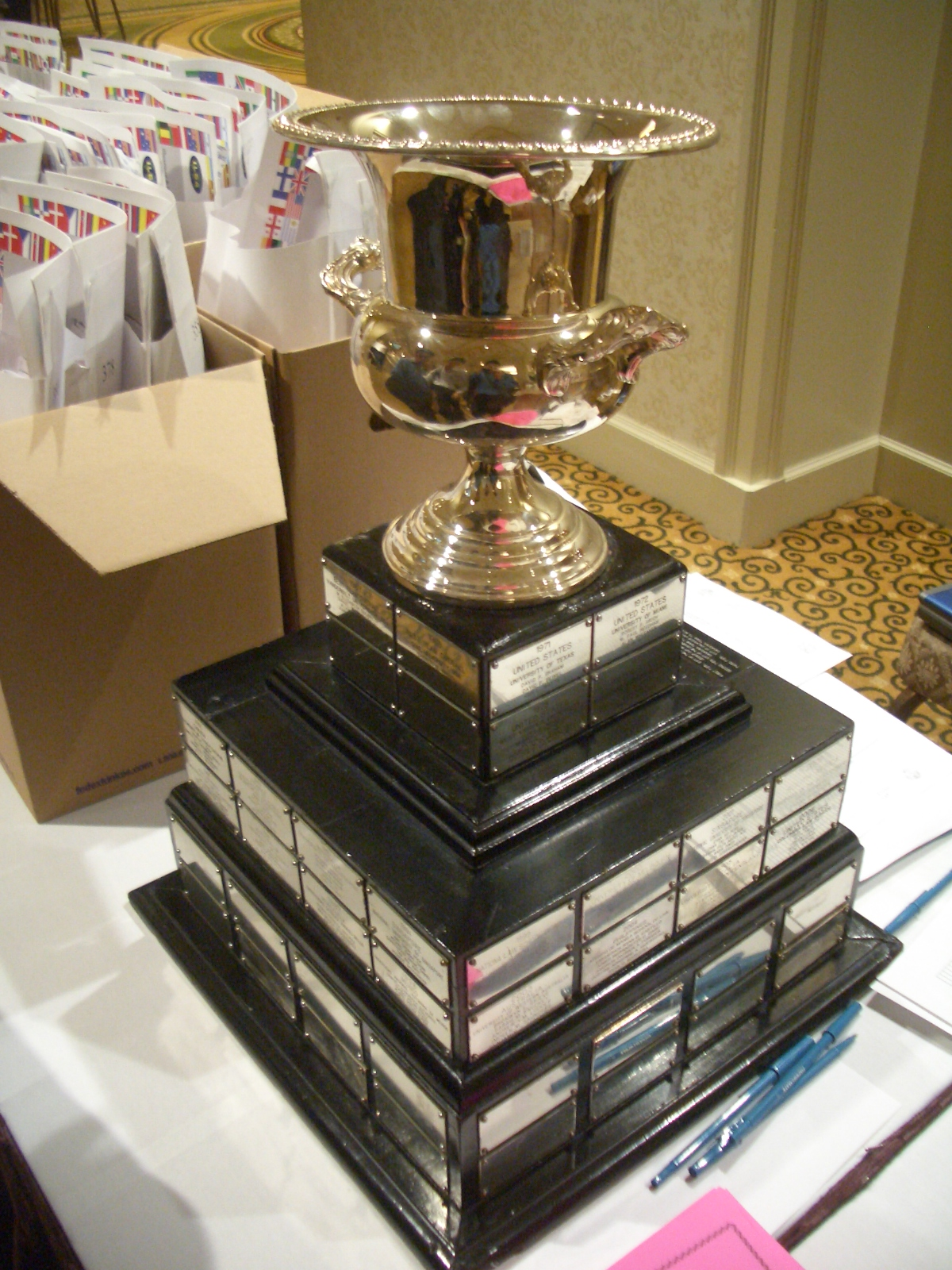
The Jessup Cup on display during the 2007 competition

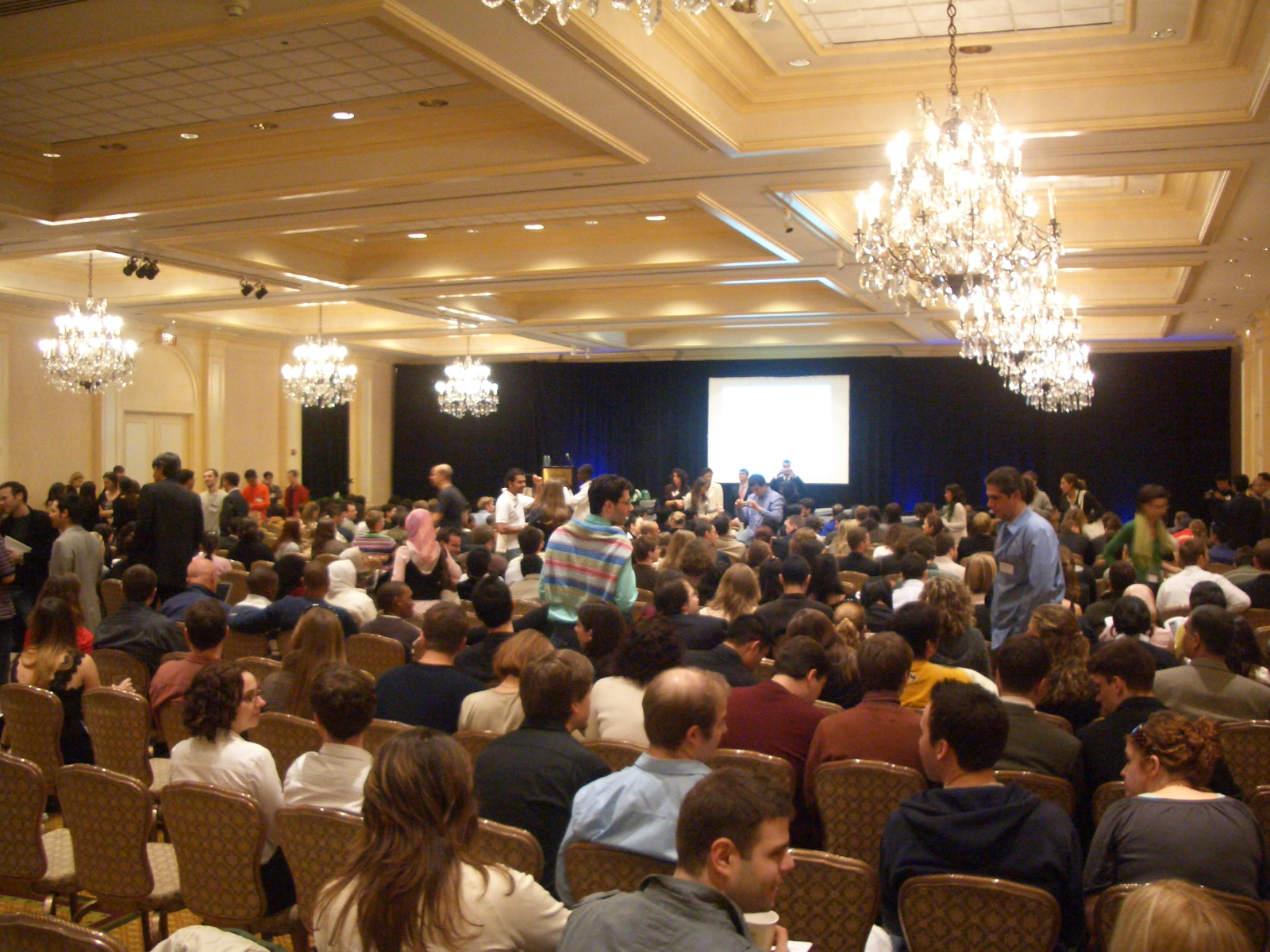
The first day briefing of the 2007 competition

The Jessup moot involves arguing a hypothetical case on issues of international law as if before the ICJ, but with a smaller complement of judges (three instead of 15). The ILSA Board is responsible for soliciting and selecting proposals for the compromis every year.

Each team comprises two to five student members. Each team must prepare to argue both Applicant and Respondent, and must produce a written memorial for each side. In each oral round, two competitors from a team will argue one side of the case for 45 minutes in total, including any time reserved for rebuttal or sur-rebuttal. A third team member may be seated at the bar table as of-counsel, but may not present argument. Most teams include at least one advisor or coach, usually drawn from the respective universities' international law faculty or past Jessup competitors.

Most countries hold qualifying rounds to select the best team or teams to advance to the international phase of the competition. This has mostly been held in Washington, D.C., sometimes in conjunction with the annual meeting of the American Society of International Law. Generally, each country can only send one school for every ten law schools that participate in the moot. This is subject to a cap and also rules pertaining to prior performance in the international rounds. In recent years, more than 800 schools worldwide participate in the competition, with the top 160 or so qualifying for the international rounds. Teams that do not qualify may be invited to participate in exhibition rounds.

In the international rounds, teams compete in four preliminary rounds, with the top 48 or more teams advancing to the knockout stages and the top 16 teams receiving a bye to the Round of 32. Each oral round and memorial is usually evaluated by a panel of three judges, and memorials are re-assessed for knockout and award purposes. Judges for most of the rounds are usually practicing lawyers or academics, while notable academics and international judges are usually invited to judge the semi-Final and world championship round matches.

The COVID-19 pandemic led to the cancellation of the oral rounds for the first time. For the 2021 edition, the oral rounds went fully online using the Yaatly platform, and all teams were allowed to participate regardless of the outcome of any national or regional round, and teams could moot seated. The top 168 out of 548 teams from the first four preliminary matches proceeded to compete in four additional advanced rounds, from which the top 48 teams competed in the knockout stages, with the top 16 seeds receiving a bye to the round of 32. In a departure from past practice, the choice of side was determined by the organisers rather than the higher-ranked team. In the 2022 edition, a modified global format was adopted. The 2023 edition of the international rounds saw a return to the in-person format.

== Past winners and records (international rounds) ==
Although the moot was founded in 1960, no winners were declared for the first three editions of the competition. The competition was only first open to countries outside the United States in 1968, and outside of North America in 1970. The first international awards were handed out in 1972.

=== Pre-international era (1960 to 1967) ===
Year	Champion	Runner-up	Semi-finalists	Memorial winners	Number of teams
1960	No Champion Declared	—	—	—	2
1961	No Champion Declared	—	—	—	4
1962	No Champion Declared	—	—	—	6
1963	Columbia University (United States)	University of North Carolina (United States)		Overall: Columbia University (United States)	8
1964	University of Texas (United States)	—		Overall: University of Texas (United States)	15
1965	Columbia University (United States)	University of Virginia (United States)		Overall: Columbia University (United States)	16
1966	University of Texas (United States)	University of Wisconsin (United States)		Overall: University of Texas (United States)	27
1967	Vanderbilt University (United States)	Harvard University (United States)		Overall: Vanderbilt University (United States)	35

=== International era (1968 to present) ===
Year	Champion and finalist	Semi-finalists	Quarter-finalists	Memorial winners	Teams worldwide	Teams at International Rounds
1968	Duke University (US); University of Miami (US)			Overall: Duke University (US)	32	6
1969	Joint winners Rutgers University (US); University of Michigan (US)			Overall: California Western University (US)	40	8
1970	University of Miami (US); University of Kentucky (US)			Overall: University of Miami (US)	56	9
1971	University of Texas (US); University of California at Davis (US)			Overall: Vanderbilt University (US)	73	9
1972	University of Miami (US); Haile Selassie I University (Ethiopia)			Overall: Haile Selassie I University (Ethiopia)	99	16
1973	West Virginia University (US); Brunel University (UK)			Evans Award: State University of Utrecht (Netherlands)	94	17
1974	University of Texas (US); Haile Selassie I University (Ethiopia)			Evans Award: University of Nigeria (Nigeria)	103	18
1975	Cambridge University (UK); Georgetown University (US)			Evans Award: University of Toronto (Canada)	119	20
1976	University of Toronto (Canada); American University (US)			Evans Award: University of Toronto (Canada)	134	22
1977	University of Kansas (US); University of Toronto (Canada)			Overall: University of Toronto (Canada)	157	29
1978	Brooklyn Law School (US); University of Toronto (Canada)			Applicant: University of Toronto (Canada); Respondent: University of Toronto (Canada)	154	20
1979	Northwestern University (US); University of Adelaide (Australia)			Applicant: University of the Philippines (Philippines); Respondent: University of the Philippines (Philippines)	187	34
1980	Georgetown University (US); National University of Singapore (Singapore)			Applicant: University of Washington (US); Respondent: University of Washington (US)	196	35
1981	Australian National University (Australia); University of the Pacific (US)			Applicant: University of Georgia (United States); Respondent: Washington and Lee University (US)	181	28
1982	National University of Singapore (Singapore); University of the Pacific (US)			Applicant: National University of Singapore (Singapore); Respondent: Fordham University (US)	197	29
1983	University of Kansas (US); National University of Singapore (Singapore)			Applicant: Fordham University (US); Respondent: Fordham University (US)	206	30
1984	Dalhousie University (Canada); South Texas College of Law (US)			Applicant: Freie Universitaet (Germany); Respondent: Freie Universitaet (Germany)	197	33
1985	National University of Singapore (Singapore); Southwestern University School of Law (United States)			Applicant: Monash University (Australia); Respondent: Monash University (Australia)	213	36
1986	Boston College (US); National University of Singapore (Singapore)			Applicant: Boston College (US); Respondent: Boston College (US)	214	38
1987	Georgetown University (US); Katholieke Universiteit Leuven (Belgium)			Applicant: National University of Singapore (Singapore); Respondent: National University of Singapore (Singapore)	268	40
1988	University of Melbourne (Australia); National University of Singapore (Singapore)	Columbia University (US); Leiden University (Netherlands)		Applicant: Southern Illinois University (US); Respondent: Southern Illinois University (US)	265	39
1989	University of British Columbia (Canada); University of Melbourne (Australia)	New York University (US); University of the Philippines (Philippines)		Applicant: University of British Columbia (Canada); Respondent: University of British Columbia (Canada)	259	39
1990	University of Georgia (US); University of Toronto (Canada)	University of Melbourne (Australia); National University of Singapore (Singapore)		Applicant: South Texas College of Law (US); Respondent: University of Melbourne (Australia)	253	40
1991	University of Saskatchewan (Canada); University of Georgia (US)	University of Sydney (Australia); University of Malaya (Malaysia)	University of Georgia (US); Dr Ambedkar Government Law College (India)	Applicant: University of Georgia (US); Respondent: University of Georgia (US)	243	42
1992	Universite de Paris I (France); National University of Singapore (Singapore)	University of Washington (US); McGill University (Canada)	University of Adelaide (Australia); University of Pennsylvania (US); Kiel University (Germany); University of Vienna (Austria)	Applicant: University of the Pacific (US); Respondent: University of Washington (US)	242	33
1993	University of Melbourne (Australia); University of Hawaii (US)	National University of Singapore; University of British Columbia (Canada)	Georgetown University (US); Ateneo Law School (Philippines); McGill University (Canada); University of Vienna (Austria)	Applicant: University of Minnesota (US); Respondent: Dr Ambedkar Government Law College, Chennai (India)	261	43
1994	National University of Singapore (Singapore); University of Melbourne (Australia)	University of Vienna (Austria); University of Georgia (US)	Georgetown University (US); University of New South Wales (Australia); International Islamic University (Malaysia); Universidad de Costa Rica (Costa Rica)	Applicant: International Islamic University (Malaysia); Respondent: University of Alabama (US)	269	47
1995	University of the Philippines (Philippines); University of Western Australia (Australia)	Dr Ambedkar Government Law College (India); University of San Diego (US)	University of Sydney (Australia); University of British Columbia (Canada); Emory University (US); Kiel University (Germany)	Applicant: University of Alabama (US); Respondent: University of Hawaii (US)	259	49
1996	University of Sydney (Australia); National University of Singapore (Singapore)			Applicant: National University of Singapore (Singapore); Respondent: University of Vienna (Austria)	300	54
1997	Universidad Catolica Andres Bello (Venezuela); University of Calgary (Canada)	Kerala Law Academy (India); Law Society of Ireland (Ireland)	Georgetown University (US); University of New South Wales (Australia); University of Malaya (Malaysia); University of Vienna (Austria)	Evans Award: University of Vienna (Austria)	280	55
1998	Universidad Autonoma Nacional de Mexico (Mexico); Australian National University (Australia)	University of Canterbury (New Zealand); National University of Singapore (Singapore)	National Law School of India University (India); University of Michigan (US); McGill University (Canada); University of Vienna (Austria)	Applicant: University of Hawaii (US); Respondent: University of Hawaii (US)	275	57
1999	National Law School of India University (India); University of Pretoria (South Africa)	Bond University (Australia); Universidad Catolica Andres Bello (Venezuela)	National University of Singapore (Singapore); Northwestern University (US); Universidad de los Andes (Colombia); Erasmus University (Netherlands)	Applicant: Katholieke Universiteit Leuven (Belgium); Respondent: University of Saskatchewan (Canada)	275	62
2000	University of Melbourne (Australia); Universidad Catolica Andres Bello (Venezuela)	Law Society of Ireland (Ireland); Universidad Nacional Autonoma de Mexico (Mexico)	Duke University (US); Hong Kong University (Hong Kong); Aristotle University (Greece); State University of Moldova (Moldova)	Applicant: University of Alabama (US); Respondent: International Islamic University (Malaysia)	287	67
2001	National University of Singapore (Singapore); Universidad Catolica Andres Bello (Venezuela)	Bond University (Australia); University of Virginia (US)	University of Georgia (US); University of British Columbia (Canada); University of the Philippines (Philippines); University of Vienna (Austria)	Applicant: New England School of Law (US); Respondent: University of Vienna (Austria)	309	68
2002	University of the Witwatersrand (South Africa); University of Western Australia (Australia)	Harvard University (US); University of Otago (New Zealand)	National University of Singapore (Singapore); National Law School of India University (India); University of Georgia (US); University of Copenhagen (Denmark)	Applicant: University of Otago (New Zealand); Respondent: Harvard University (US)	384	75
2003	University of Western Australia (Australia); Mari State University (Russia)	Columbia University (US); Universidad Catolica Andres Bello (Venezuela)	Harvard University (US); National University of Singapore (Singapore); National Law School of India University (India); Universidad de Buenos Aires (Argentina)	Applicant: Universidad Catolica Andres Bello (Venezuela); Respondent: Bond University (Australia)	481	83
2004	Ateneo Law School (Philippines); National University of Singapore (Singapore)	Universidad Nacional Autonoma de Mexico (Mexico); University of Vienna (Austria)	Harvard University (US); Hong Kong University (Hong Kong); Monash University (Australia); International Islamic University (Malaysia)	Applicant: Universidad Catolica Andres Bello (Venezuela); Respondent: University of Queensland (Australia)	524	94
2005	University of Queensland (Australia); International Islamic University (Malaysia)	Universidad de Buenos Aires (Argentina); American University (US)	Universidad Catolica Andres Bello (Venezuela); Universidad Nacional Autonoma de Mexico (Mexico); University of Vienna (Austria)	Applicant: Universidad Catolica Andres Bello (Venezuela); Respondent: Columbia University (US)	543	103
2006	Columbia University (US); Universidad Catolica Andres Bello (Venezuela)	NALSAR University of Law (India); University of Cape Town (South Africa)	University of Toronto (Canada); University of the Philippines (Philippines); Lewis & Clark Law School (US); Universidad Autonoma Nacional de Mexico (Mexico)	Applicant: Hong Kong University (Hong Kong); Respondent: Kiel University (Germany)	565	101
2007	University of Sydney (Australia); King's College London (UK)	National University of Singapore (Singapore); University of Queensland (Australia)	University of Ottawa (Canada); University College London (UK); University of California, Hastings (US); Lewis & Clark Law School (US)	Applicant: Universidad de Buenos Aires (Argentina); Respondent: Washington University in St Louis (US)		101
2008	Case Western Reserve University (US); University of New South Wales (Australia)	University College London (UK); National Law School of India University (India)	National University of Singapore (Singapore); Auckland University (New Zealand); Ateneo de Manila University (Philippines); Katholieke Universiteit Leuven (Belgium)	Applicant: Ateneo de Manila University (Philippines); Respondent: University of Ottawa (Canada)		110
2009	Universidad de los Andes (Colombia); University College London (UK)	Aristotle University (Greece); Universidad de Buenos Aires (Argentina)	National Law School of India University (India); University of Ottawa (Canada); Universidad Catolica Andres Bello (Venezuela); London School of Economics (UK)	Applicant: King's College London (UK); Respondent: University of Sydney (Australia)		
2010	Australian National University (Australia); Columbia University (US)	NALSAR University of Law (India); University of Ljubljana (Slovenia)	National Law School of India University; University of Western Australia (Australia); Universidad de los Andes (Chile); University College London (UK)	Applicant: National University of Singapore (Singapore); Respondent: Australian National University (Australia)		127
2011	University of Sydney (Australia); Columbia University (US)	National University of Singapore (Singapore); Norman Manley Law School (Jamaica)	West Bengal National University of Juridical Sciences (India); Arizona State University (US); Hebrew University of Jerusalem (Israel); Universidad de Buenos Aires (Argentina)	Applicant: Case Western Reserve University (US); Respondent: University of Sydney (Australia)		
2012	Moscow State University (Russia); Columbia University (US)	University of the Philippines (Philippines); Auckland University (New Zealand)	University of Ottawa (Canada); University of Melbourne (Australia); University of California, Hastings (US); Oxford University (UK)	Applicant: National Law School of India University (India); Respondent: Columbia University (US)	605	137
2013	National Law School of India University (India); Singapore Management University (Singapore)	Columbia University (US); Universidad de Buenos Aires (Argentina)	University of California, Hastings (US); University of New South Wales (Australia); Murdoch University (Australia); Hebrew University of Jerusalem (Israel)	Applicant: Universite de Luxembourg (Luxembourg); Respondent: National Law University, Delhi (India)	632	
2014	University of Queensland (Australia); Singapore Management University (Singapore)	Columbia University (US); King's College London (UK)	Washington University in St Louis (US); University of Ljubljana (Slovenia); Oxford University (UK); King's College London (UK)	Applicant: University of Queensland (Australia); Respondent: Universitas Pelita Harapan (Indonesia)	675	124
2015	University of Sydney (Australia); Pontificia Universidad Católica de Chile (Chile)	Oxford University (UK); University of Western Australia (Australia)	NALSAR University of Law (India); Moscow State University of International Relations (Russia); Katholieke Universiteit Leuven (Belgium); Universidade Federal de Minas Gerais (Brazil)	Applicant: University of National and World Economy (Bulgaria); Respondent: University of Pennsylvania (US)		127
2016	Universidad de Buenos Aires (Argentina); University of Pennsylvania (US)	Columbia University (US); King's College London (UK)	Hebrew University of Jerusalem (Israel); New York University (US); Washington University in St Louis (US); University of Vienna (Austria)	Applicant: Columbia University (US); Respondent: Columbia University (US)		132
2017	University of Sydney (Australia); Norman Manley Law School (Jamaica)	National Law University Odisha (India); University of Western Ontario (Canada)	National Law Institute University, Bhopal (India); Moscow State University of International Relations (Russia); Humboldt University of Berlin (Germany); King's College London (UK)	Applicant: University of the Philippines (Philippines); Respondent: University of Queensland (Australia)	650	143
2018	University of Queensland (Australia); National Law School of India University (India)	Pontificia Universidad Católica de Chile (Chile); King's College London (UK)	University of Pretoria (South Africa); Moscow State University of International Relations (Russia); Yale University (US); LMU Munich (Germany)	Applicant: University of San Carlos (Philippines); Respondent: University of Pretoria (South Africa)	600	145
2019	Eötvös Loránd University (Hungary); Columbia University (US)	National University of Singapore (Singapore); Yale University (US)	Auckland University (New Zealand); King's College London (UK); University of the Philippines (Philippines); Universidad Buenos Aires (Argentina)	Applicant: National Law University, Jodhpur (India); Respondent: Auckland University (New Zealand)	600	124
2020	Cancelled due to COVID-19	NA	NA	Applicant: Universidad de Buenos Aires (Argentina); Respondent: Sofia University (Bulgaria)	NA	NA
2021 (online)	University of Sydney (Australia); National University of Singapore (Singapore)	National Law University Odisha (India); University of San Carlos (Philippines)	University of Cambridge (UK)	Applicant: University of Pennsylvania (US); Respondent: University of Münster (Germany)	548	548
2022 (online)	Harvard University (US); Singapore Management University (Singapore)	Universidad Autonoma Nacional de Mexico (Mexico); Universidade de Sao Paulo (Brazil)	Hertie School (Germany); University of New South Wales (Australia); University of Queensland (Australia); University of Western Ontario (Canada)	Applicant: University of Geneva (Switzerland); Respondent: Singapore Management University (Singapore)	650	200
2023	University of Amsterdam (Netherlands); Peking University (China)	Singapore Management University (Singapore); China University of Political Science & Law (China)	Ateneo Law School (Philippines); Eötvös Loránd University (Hungary); Oxford University (UK); Universidad Torcuato Di Tella (Argentina)	Applicant: Harvard University (US); Respondent: Rajiv Gandhi National University of Law (India)	550	140
2024	University of the Philippines (Philippines); Universidad Torcuato Di Tella (Argentina)	Oxford University (UK); Universidade de Sao Paulo (Brazil)	Singapore Management University (Singapore); National Law University Delhi (India); New York University (US); Universidade Federal de Uberlândia (Brazil)	Applicant: University of Toronto (Canada); Respondent: Ateneo De Manila University (Philippines)	640	150
2025	Singapore Management University (Singapore); National University of Kyiv-Mohyla Academy (Ukraine)	University of Queensland (Australia); NALSAR University (India)	National Law School of India University (India); Strathmore University (Kenya); Tashkent State University (Uzbekistan); Universidad de Los Andes (Colombia)	Applicant: University of San Carlos (Philippines); Respondent: Katholieke Universiteit Leuven (Belgium)	803	160
2026	National University of Singapore (Singapore); Ateneo Law School (Philippines)	University of Sydney (Australia); Universidad Torcuato Di Tella (Argentina)	University of San Carlos (Philippines); Universidad de Buenos Aires (Argentina); Macquarie University (Australia); York University (Canada)	Applicant: National University of Advanced Legal Studies (India); Respondent: Peking University School of Transnational Law (China)	807	165

== Track record (international rounds) ==
The University of Sydney has won the most number of championships, winning the Jessup Cup six times (with the sixth title won in 2021, which were conducted online due to COVID-19). Five law schools have made the final on their international debuts: Australian National University (1981); Dalhousie University (1984); University of Saskatchewan (1991); University of Western Australia (1995); and Singapore Management University (2013). Of these schools, ANU, Dalhousie, and Saskatchewan won their finals.

=== University (1968 to 2026) ===
University	Champion	Runner-up	Semi-Finalist	Baxter Award (1st) or Best Memorial	Best Overall Applicant Side or Best Overall Respondent Side	Dillard Award (1st)	Evans Award (1st)	Best oralist (1st)	Best finals oralist	Last championship	Last finals appearance	Debut/Debut in international rounds
University of Sydney (Australia)	6 (1996; 2007; 2011; 2015; 2017; 2021 (online))	0	2 (1991; 2026)	1 (2011)	2 (2015; 2021)	1 (2007)		4 (1996; 1998; 2000; 2015)	3 (2007; 2015; 2017)	2017; 2021 (online)	2017; 2021 (online)	1977/1991
National University of Singapore (Singapore)	5 (1982; 1985; 1994; 2001; 2026)	8 (1980; 1983; 1986; 1988; 1992; 1996; 2004; 2021 (online))	6 (1990; 1993; 1998; 2007; 2011; 2019)	5 (1982; 1987; 1987; 1996; 2010)	1 (2016)		4 (1982; 1983; 1985; 1987)	5 (1976; 1988; 1989; 2016; 2021 (online))	8 (1980; 1982; 1985; 1996; 2001; 2004; 2021 (online); 2026)	2026	2026	1973/1973
University of Melbourne (Australia)	3 (1988; 1993; 2000)	2 (1989; 1994)	1 (1990)	1 (1990)	1 (2012)	1 (2000)	2 (1988; 1993)	1 (2012)	4 (1988; 1993; 1994; 2000)	2000	2000	1977/1980
University of Queensland (Australia)	3 (2005; 2014; 2018)	0	2 (2007; 2025)	3 (2004; 2014; 2017)	4 (2014; 2019; 2025 (2))		1 (2017)		1 (2014)	2018	2018	1977/2002
Australian National University (Australia)	2 (1981; 2010)	1 (1998)		1 (2010)			2 (1981; 1998)	1 (1981)	2 (1981; 1998)	2010	2010	1977/1981
University of Miami (United States)	2 (1970; 1972)	1 (1968)		1 (1970)				1 (1970)		1972	1972	1968/1968
Georgetown University (United States)	2 (1980; 1987)	1 (1975)		0					1 (1987)	1987	1987	
University of Texas (United States)	2 (excludes 2 before 1968)	0		0 (excludes 2 before 1968)				2 (1971; 1972)	2 (1971; 1974)	1974	1974	1968/1968
University of Kansas (United States)	2 (1977; 1983)	0		0					2 (1977; 1983)	1983	1983	
University of the Philippines (Philippines)	2 (1995; 2024)	0	2 (1989; 2012)	3 (1979 (2); 2017)			1 (1979)	3 (1975; 1979; 2022 (online))	1 (2024)	2024	2024	
National Law School of India University (India)	2 (1999; 2013)	1 (2018)	1 (2008)	1 (2012)					2 (2013; 2018)	2013	2018	
Columbia University (United States)	1 (excludes 2 before 1968)	4 (2010; 2011; 2012; 2019)	5 (1988; 2003; 2013; 2014; 2016)	4 (2005; 2012; 2016 (2)) (excludes 2 before 1968)	3 (2012; 2013; 2018)	1 (2012)	4 (1988; 2001; 2010; 2012)	3 (2010; 2011; 2021 (online)) (excludes 1 before 1968)	4 (2006; 2010; 2011; 2012)	2006	2019	1968/1968
Singapore Management University (Singapore)	1 (2025)	3 (2013; 2014; 2022 (online))	1 (2023)	1 (2022)		0	0		1 (2025)	2025	2025	2011/2013
University of Toronto (Canada)	1 (1976)	3 (1977; 1978; 1990)		4 (1977; 1978; 1978; 2024)			4 (1975; 1976; 1977; 1978)	3 (1977; 1983; 1990)	2 (1976; 1990)	1976	1990	1968/1970
Universidad Catolica Andres Bello (Venezuela)	1 (1997)	3 (2000; 2001; 2006)	2 (1999, 2003)	3 (2003; 2004; 2005)		1 (2004)	1 (2004)		1 (1997)	1997	2006	
University of Western Australia (Australia)	1 (2003)	2 (1995; 2002)	1 (2015)	0		1 (1999)		2 (1997; 2003)	3 (1995; 2002; 2003)	2003	2003	1977/1995
University of Georgia (United States)	1 (1990)	1 (1991)		3 (1981; 1991; 1991)				2 (2001; 2004)	1 (1991)	1990	1991	
Boston College (United States)	1 (1986)	0		2 (1986; 1986)				1 (1990)	1 (1986)	1986	1986	
University of British Columbia (Canada)	1 (1989)	0	1 (1993)	2 (1989; 1989)				1 (1995)	1 (1989)	1989	1989	1968/1980
University of Buenos Aires (Argentina)	1 (2016)	0	3 (2005, 2009, 2013)	2 (2007; 2020)					1 (2016)	2016	2016	
Ateneo de Manila University (Philippines)	1 (2004)	1 (2026)		1 (2008)			2 (2008; 2011)			2004	2026	
Dalhousie University (Canada)	1 (1984)	0						1 (1984)	1 (1984)	1984	1984	1968/1984
Case Western Reserve University (United States)	1 (2008)	0		1 (2011)				2 (2022 (online); 2023)	1 (2008)	2008	2008	
University of Saskatchewan (Canada)	1 (1991)	0		1 (1999)						1991	1991	1968/1991
Moscow State University (Russia)	1 (2012)	0								2012	2012	
Universidad de los Andes (Colombia)	1 (2009)	0					1 (2009)		1 (2009)	2009	2009	
Cambridge University (UK)	1 (1975)	0						1 (1975)	1 (1975)	1975	1975	
Université de Paris I (France)	1 (1992)	0					1 (1991)	1 (1999)	1 (1992)	1992	1992	
Brooklyn Law School (United States)	1	0							1 (1978)	1978	1978	
University of Michigan (United States)	1	0		0			1 (2006)	1 (1969)		1969	1969	
Eötvös Loránd University (Hungary)	1	0				1 (2018)	1 (2018)		1 (2019)	2019	2019	
Harvard University (United States)	1 (1 online)	0 (excludes 1 before 1968)	1 (2002)	1 (2002)	1 (2023)	2 (2002; 2023)	2 (2002; 2023)	0 (excludes 1 before 1968)	1 (2022 (online))	2022 (online)	2022 (online)	1968/1968
University of Amsterdam (The Netherlands)	1	0							1 (2023)	2023	2023	
University of Georgia (US)	1 (1990)	1 (1991)	1 (1994)									
Universidad Nacional Autónoma de México (Mexico)	1 (1998)	0	3 (2000, 2004, 2022)									
Haile Selassie I University (Ethiopia)	0	2		1 (1972)				1 (1974)	1 (1972)	NA	1974	
University of the Pacific (United States)	0	2		0						NA	1982	
Universidad Torcuato Di Tella (Argentina)	0	1				1 (2021)					2024	2013/2015
Vanderbilt University (United States)	0 (excludes 1 before 1968)	0		1 (1971) (excludes 1 before 1968)				0 (excludes 1 before 1968)				1968/
Duke University (United States)	0 (excludes 1 before 1968)	0		1 (1968)				1 (1968)		1968	1968	1968/1968
University of Hawaii (United States)	0	1		3 (1995; 1998; 1998)		1 (1993)	1 (1995)	1 (1993)		NA	1993	
University of New South Wales (Australia)	0	1			1 (2013)			1 (2013)		NA	2008	1977/1983
University College, London (UK)	0	1						1 (2008)		NA	2009	
King's College, London (UK)	0	1	3 (2014, 2016, 2018)	1 (2009)		1 (2009)				NA	2007	
International Islamic University (Malaysia)	0	1		2 (1994; 2000)			1 (2000)		1 (2005)	NA	2005	
University of Calgary (Canada)	0	1					1 (1998)	1 (2005)		NA	1997	1968/1988
South Texas College of Law (United States)	0	1		1						NA	1984	
University of Adelaide (Australia)	0	1						1 (1978)	1 (1979)	NA	1979	1977/1977
Southern Illinois University (United States)	0	0		3 (1988 (2); 1992)		2 (1989; 1992)	1 (1992)	1 (2006)		NA	NA	
Norman Manley Law School (Jamaica)	0	1 (2017)	1 (2011)									
Pontificia Universidad Católica de Chile (Chile)	0	1	1 (2018)									
University College London (UK)	0	1 (2010)	1 (2008)									
University of San Carlos (Philippines)			1 (2021)	2 (2018, 2024)	1 (2022)		1 (2024)					

=== Country (1968 to 2026) ===
Country	Default cap on teams at international rounds	Number of championships	Number of runners-up	Number of finals appearances	Last championship	Last finals appearance	Debut
United States	14	18 (excludes 5 before 1968; 1 online)	13 (excludes 4 before 1968)	32 (excludes 9 before 1968; 1 online)	2022 (online)	2022 (online)	1968
Australia	3	14 (1 online)	7	21 (1 online)	2021 (online)	2021 (online)	1977
Singapore	1	6	11 (2 online)	17 (2 online)	2026	2026	1973
Canada	3	4	4	8	1991	1997	1968
Philippines	3	3	0	3	2024	2024	1975
India	8	2	1	3	2013	2018	1991
UK	3	1	3	4	1975	2009	1970
Venezuela	1	1	3	4	1997	2006	
Russia	6	1	1	2	2012	2012	
South Africa	2	1	1	2	2002	2002	
Argentina	2	1	1	2	2016	2024	
Colombia	2	1	0	1	2009	2009	
France	1	1	0	1	1992	1992	
Mexico	2	1	0	1	1998	1998	
Hungary	1	1	0	1	2019	2019	
The Netherlands	2	1	0	1	2023	2023	

== Notable former participants ==
- Ang Cheng Hock (1995, National University of Singapore) – Senior Counsel, Deputy Attorney-General of Singapore, and Judge of Appeal of Supreme Court of Singapore
- Hilary Charlesworth (1980, University of Melbourne) – Professor of international law and Judge of the International Court of Justice
- Steven Chong (1982, National University of Singapore) – Senior Counsel, Attorney-General of Singapore, and Judge of Appeal of Supreme Court of Singapore
- Peta Credlin (1995, University of Melbourne) – Chief of Staff to former Australian Prime Minister Tony Abbott
- Francisco Domenech (2002, University of Puerto Rico) – Director of the Office of Legislative Services of Puerto Rico
- James Edelman (1996, University of Western Australia) – University of Oxford Professor and Justice of the High Court of Australia
- Mahmud Jamal (1993, McGill University) – Justice of the Supreme Court of Canada
- Sundaresh Menon (1986, National University of Singapore) – Senior Counsel, Attorney-General of Singapore, and Chief Justice of Singapore
- S. Muralidhar (1984, Madras Law College) – Chief Justice of the Orissa High Court, Judge of the High Court of Punjab and Haryana, Judge of the High Court of Delhi
- Georg Nolte (1984, Free University of Berlin) – Professor of international law and judge of the International Court of Justice
- Raul Pangalangan (1983, University of the Philippines) – Judge of International Criminal Court
- Bruce Poole (1984, Washington and Lee University) – Chairman of the Maryland Democratic Party
- Judith Prakash (1974, National University of Singapore) – Judge of Appeal of Supreme Court of Singapore
- V.K. Rajah (1982, National University of Singapore) – Senior Counsel, Judge of Appeal of Supreme Court of Singapore, and Attorney-General of Singapore
- Indranee Rajah (1986, National University of Singapore) – Senior Counsel and Minister in Prime Minister's Office of Singapore
- Marco Rubio (1995, University of Miami School of Law) – US Senator from Florida, 2016 US presidential candidate, and United States Secretary of State
- K. Shanmugam (1984, National University of Singapore) – Senior Counsel and Minister for Law and Home Affairs, Singapore
- Davinder Singh (1982, National University of Singapore) – Senior Counsel and former CEO of Drew & Napier and Singapore International Arbitration Centre
- Brad Smith (1984, Columbia University) – President and Chief Legal Officer of Microsoft
- Arif Virani (1997, University of Toronto) – Minister of Justice and Attorney General of Canada
- Lucien Wong (1977, National University of Singapore) – Attorney-General of Singapore
- Woo Bih Li (1977, National University of Singapore) – Senior Counsel and High Court Judge of Supreme Court of Singapore

== Cultural impact ==
In 2013, White & Case commissioned a 95-minute documentary, All Rise, which followed the Jessup journeys of seven teams around the world; the film made its world premiere at Doc NYC.
