= Vaune Phan =

Singaporean influencer

Vaune Phan (born 1987 or 1988 (age 38–39), Chinese: 潘盈升; pinyin: Pān Yíngshēng) is a Singaporean social media influencer and blogger whose focus is on motorcycles.

== Biography ==
Phan's interest in dirt bike riding was sparked by a motocross videogame she played when she was 10. Since 2010, Phan has been riding motorcycles.

In 2015, Phan made a month long, 8,000 km journey, from Singapore to Mount Everest Base Camp to awareness and funds for the Singapore Disability Sports Council and disabled athletes on a Suzuki DR250 motorcycle.

In 2017, after the release of the annual Singapore Budget, which details the government revenue and expenditures for the year, Phan criticised the changes made to the Additional Registration Fee system for motorcycles as 'daylight robbery on citizens'. A tiered system was introduced which would increase the ARF from 15% in the first tier, to 50% in the second tier, and 100% in the 3rd tier.

On 15 December 2021, Phan won a defamation lawsuit she filed against Mark Yeow, who was found to have defamed her on four occasions by the district court judge. Yeow's defamatory statements came after Phan claimed that her Ducati 899 Panigale motorcycle was damaged when Revology Bikes, a motorcycle workshop was reinstalling a dashcam. The judge found that Phan had "an extensive online social media presence" and Yeow's statements had caused Phan's reputation to be lowered. Phan was awarded S$60,000 in damages, and other amount for legal costs. Yeow appealed the decision, and the case was brought up to the High Court. Justice Ang Cheng Hock, after deliberations, lowered the damages to be paid to S$40,000.
