= Court of Appeal of Singapore =

Supreme appellate court of Singapore

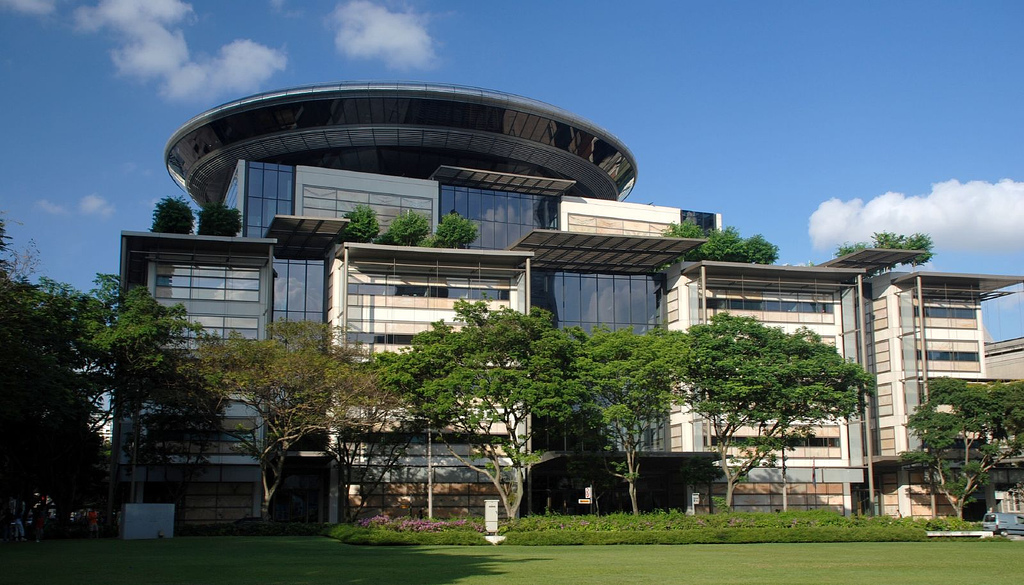
- The new Supreme Court Building opened in 2005, designed by Norman Foster
- Interactive map of Court of Appeal of Singapore
- 01°17′26″N 103°51′02″E
- Established: 9 January 1970; 56 years ago
- Coordinates: 01°17′26″N 103°51′02″E
- Composition method: Executive selection
- Authorised by: Constitution of Singapore
- Judge term length: Tenure until the age of 65, but may be re-appointed
- Number of positions: Indefinite
- Website: https://www.judiciary.gov.sg

Chief Justice of Singapore
- Currently: Sundaresh Menon
- Since: 6 November 2012

The Court of Appeal of Singapore (SGCA) is the highest court in the judicial system of Singapore. It is the upper division of the Supreme Court of Singapore, the lower being the High Court (which since 2021 has itself been sub-divided into a General Division and an Appellate Division). The Court of Appeal consists of the chief justice, who is the president of the Court, and the judges of the Court of Appeal. The chief justice may ask judges of the High Court to sit as members of the Court of Appeal to hear particular cases. The seat of the Court of Appeal is the Supreme Court Building.

The Court exercises only appellate jurisdiction in civil and criminal matters. In other words, it possesses no original jurisdiction—it does not deal with trials of matters coming before the court for the first time. In general, the Court hears civil appeals from decisions of the General Division of the High Court made in the exercise of the latter's original and appellate jurisdiction, that is, decisions on cases that started in the General Division as well as decisions that were appealed to the latter from the State Courts of Singapore. However, this rule is subject to various restrictions. Some types of General Division decisions are not appealable to the Court of Appeal, while others are only appealable if the Court grants leave (permission). Where criminal matters are concerned, the Court of Appeal only hears appeals from cases originating in the General Division. Matters heard by the General Division on appeal from the State Courts cannot be further appealed to the Court of Appeal, though questions of law may be submitted to the Court for determination.

The Court of Appeal hears appeals from the Appellate Division, which itself has solely civil appellate jurisdiction, only in exceptional cases as described below.

Under the principles of stare decisis (judicial precedent), Court of Appeal decisions are binding on the High Court and the State Courts. As Singapore's final appellate court, the Court of Appeal is not required to follow its own previous decisions and the decisions of predecessor courts such as the Supreme Court of the Straits Settlements and the Judicial Committee of the Privy Council, and may depart from or overrule such decisions if it thinks fit. However, it will generally not do so without a strong reason. The Court of Appeal is required, however, to abide by decisions of the Constitution of the Republic of Singapore Tribunal in certain situations. The Constitution of Singapore states that where the President has referred to the Tribunal a question concerning the Constitution's effect on a bill, no court—including the Court of Appeal—may subsequently question the Tribunal's opinion on the bill or, assuming the bill is found to be constitutional, the validity of any law based on the bill.

== History ==
The Court of Appeal is Singapore's highest court, and thus its court of final appeal. Its earliest predecessor was the Supreme Court of the Straits Settlements which, following legal changes introduced in 1873, had jurisdiction to sit as a Full Court of Appeal with not less than three judges and as a Divisional Court at each settlement. However, the Court of Appeal of the Straits Settlements was not the highest appellate court of the colony. From 1826, when Singapore's first court – the Court of Judicature of Prince of Wales' Island, Singapore, and Malacca – was established, appeals lay to the King-in-Council. Such appeals were taken over by the Judicial Committee of the Privy Council from 1844. A party wishing to appeal had to petition the Judicial Committee for leave (permission) to do so. In 1934, a separate Court of Criminal Appeal was established in the Straits Settlements.

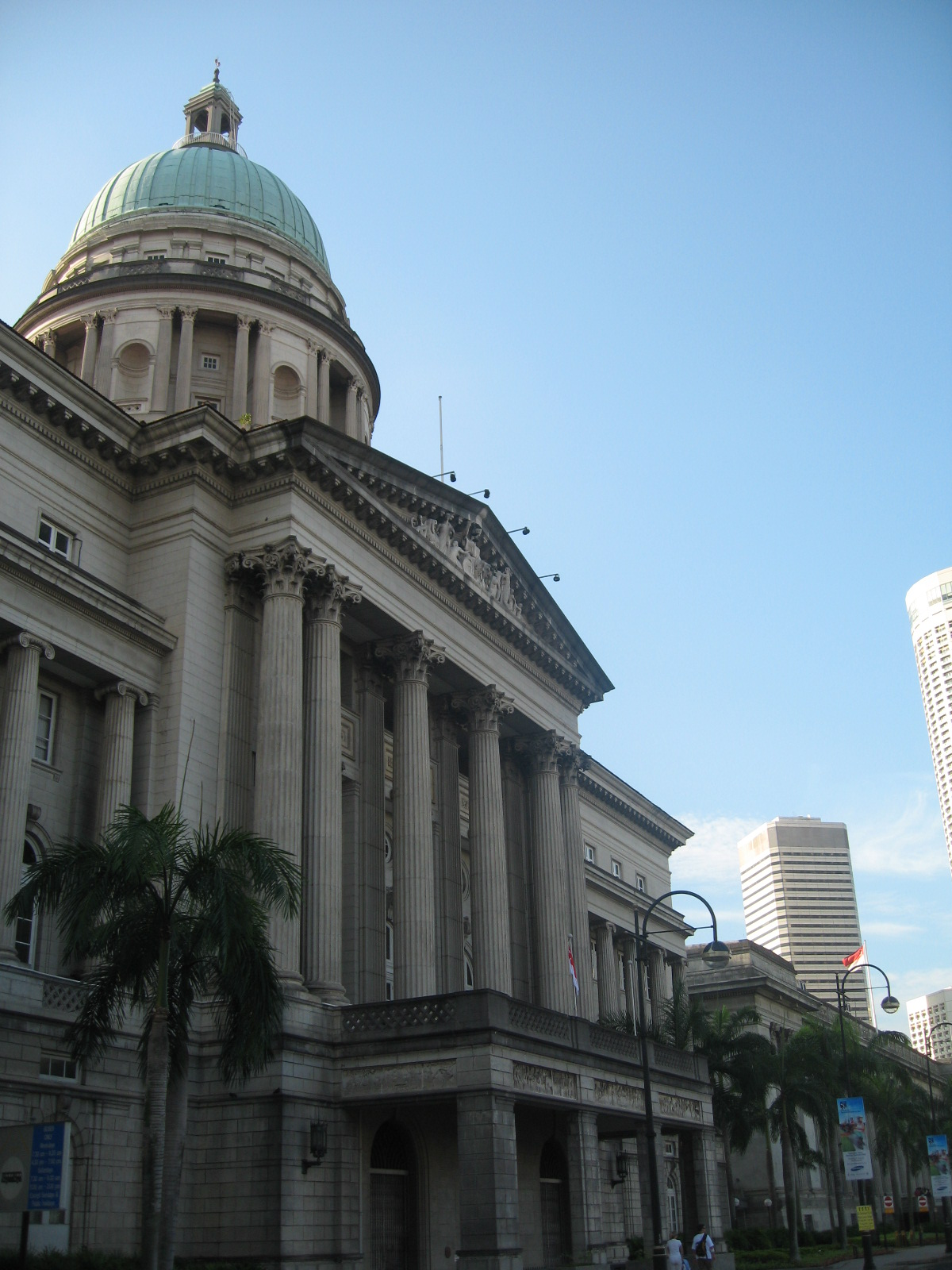
The Old Supreme Court Building, where the Court of Appeal and High Court sat between 1939 and 2005

All courts ceased to function during World War II when the Japanese occupation of Singapore began in February 1942. Though the Japanese military authorities created a court of appeal, it did not hear any cases. Following the end of the occupation in 1945, all pre-war courts were revived. There was no change in the judicial system when the Straits Settlements were dissolved in 1946 and Singapore became a crown colony in its own right, except that the Supreme Court of the Straits Settlements became known as the Supreme Court of Singapore.

Singapore ceased to be part of the British Empire in 1963 when it joined the Federation of Malaysia. In 1964, the Supreme Court of the Colony of Singapore was replaced by the High Court of Malaysia in Singapore, appeals from which lay to the Federal Court of Malaysia in Kuala Lumpur. The Privy Council remained the final appellate court, although appellants now submitted their petitions to the Yang di-Pertuan Agong (head of state of Malaysia) who sent them on to the Judicial Committee. In turn, the Judicial Committee conveyed their recommendations on appeals to the Yang di-Pertuan Agong, who then made the final orders. Singapore left the Federation in 1965. At the time of the nation's full independence, no changes were made to the judicial system. It was only with effect from 9 January 1970 that the Supreme Court of the Republic of Singapore consisting of the Court of Appeal and High Court was established. The Judicial Committee Act 1966 was passed to enable the Privy Council to continue its role as Singapore's final court of appeal, and to remove the need to petition the British monarch or the Yang di-Pertuan Agong in order to appeal.

In 1985, 21 out of 142 appeals heard by the Privy Council originated from Singapore. Moves towards full legal autochthony from Britain began in 1989, when appeals to the Privy Council were limited in the wake of a 1988 Privy Council ruling reversing the Court of Appeal's decision to strike opposition politician J.B. Jeyaretnam off the roll of advocates and solicitors for having been convicted of cheque fraud and making a false declaration concerning the accounts of the Workers' Party of Singapore. The Privy Council judged Jeyaretnam to have been the victim of a "grievous injustice" in Singapore's courts, having been "fined, imprisoned and publicly disgraced for offences of which [he and his co-accused] were not guilty". Under the new rules, in civil cases to appeal to the Privy Council all parties to the proceedings had to consent, while in criminal cases appeals could only be brought in death penalty cases when the Court of Criminal Appeal's decision had not been unanimous. Subsequently, with effect from 8 April 1994, all remaining appeals to the Privy Council were abolished. The Court of Criminal Appeal was done away with, and a single permanent Court of Appeal exercising both civil and criminal appellate jurisdiction was instituted with the Chief Justice sitting as the President of the Court together with Judges of Appeal, who rank above ordinary judges of the High Court.

With effect from 2021, due to the increasing volume and complexity of civil appeals, the High Court was in effect sub-divided into two divisions, the General Division and the Appellate Division. The General Division took over the former role and jurisdiction of the High Court, while the Appellate Division was a new court formed to relieve pressure on the Court of Appeal by hearing some civil appeals from the General Division. Civil appeals from the General Division directly to the Court of Appeal are now restricted to certain subject matters, and all other civil appeals lie to the Appellate Division. Appeals from the latter to the Court of Appeal are restricted to exceptional cases, all as described under "Jurisdiction" below.

== Composition of the Court ==
The Court of Appeal is made up of the Chief Justice, who is the President of the Court, and Justices of the Court of Appeal . The Chief Justice may appoint Judges of Appeal as vice-presidents of the Court. As of 18 October 2026, the Chief Justice was Sundaresh Menon and the current Justices of the Court of Appeal were Ang Cheng Hock, Hri Kumar Nair (both appointed on 1 October 2025), Sushil Sukumaran Nair (appointed on 15 June 2026) and Hoo Sheau Peng (appointed on 1 October 2026).

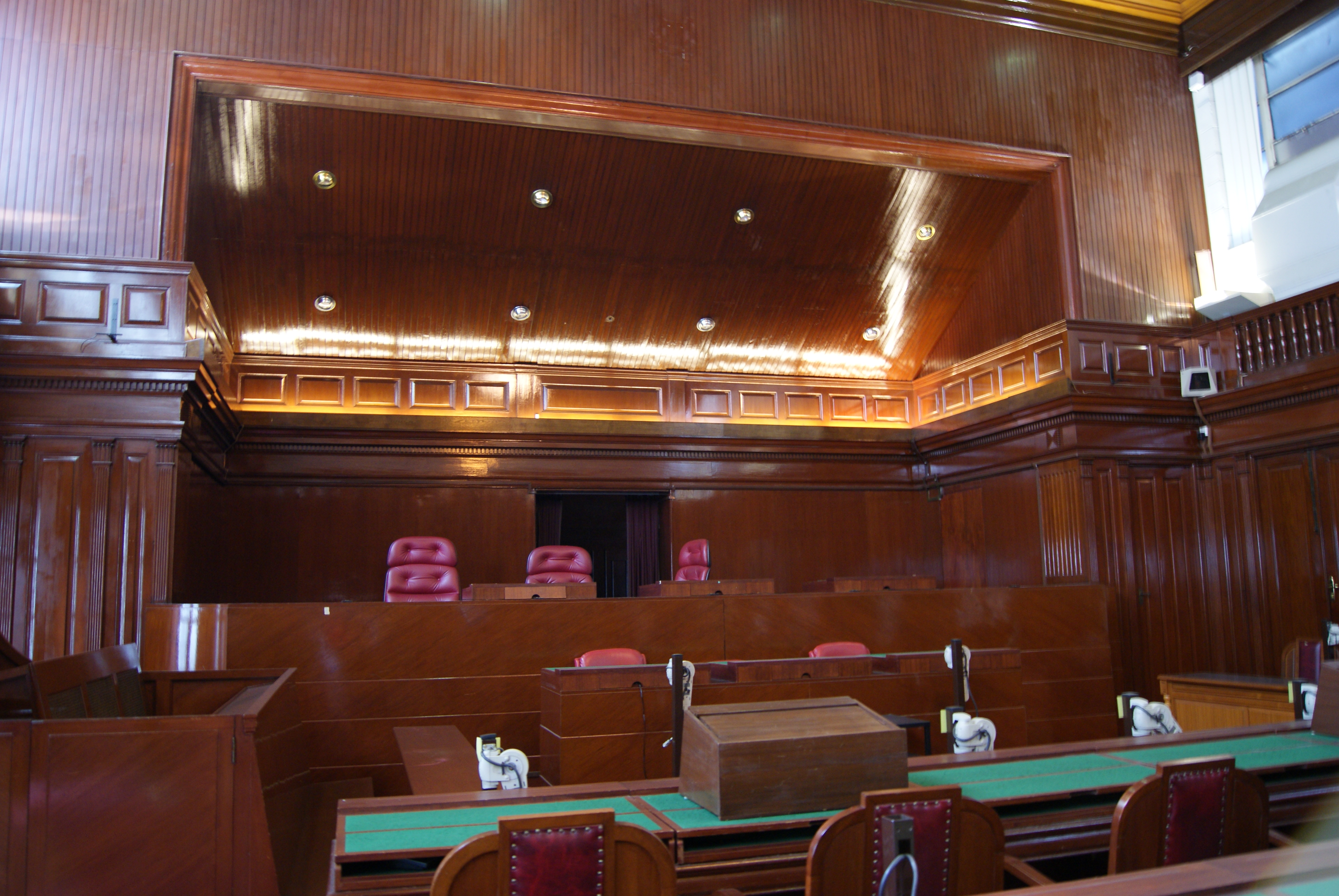
The courtroom of the Court of Appeal in the Old Supreme Court Building, photographed in October 2010

When hearing civil and criminal matters, the Court of Appeal usually sits with three Judges of Appeal, one of whom may be the Chief Justice. However, the Court may also sit with a greater uneven number of Judges of Appeal. This is done in cases of unusual difficulty or importance. The most recent case of sitting with 5 justices was the 2022 decision How Weng Fan and others v Sengkang Town Council and other appeals.

The Court may also sit with just two Judges of Appeal in appeals in civil matters against interlocutory orders and other orders apart from judgments handed down after trials commenced by writs of summons or hearings commenced by other originating processes such as originating summons. High Court judges may be requested by the Chief Justice to sit as judges of the Court of Appeal to hear specific appeals. Judges of Appeals cannot sit as members of the Court when appeals are against judgments or orders made by them, convictions made or a sentences passed by them, or questions of law reserved by them for the Court of Appeal to decide when they were acting as High Court judges. If the Court feels it requires assistance in a particular case, it may summon persons of skill and experience in the matter to which the proceedings relate to sit with the Court and act as assessors.

Matters before the Court are decided according to the opinion of the majority of the members of the Court hearing the case. If there are only two judges hearing an appeal and they disagree, the appeal is dismissed and the decision appealed against stands.

The schedule of the Court's sittings is determined every year by the Chief Justice. In general, the Court sits throughout the year except during the mid-year and end-year court vacations (usually end of May to end of June, and the beginning of December to the beginning of January respectively). The Chief Justice also appoints the places where the Court sits. When the Supreme Court moved from the Old Supreme Court Building and City Hall Building at 1 and 3 Saint Andrew's Road respectively to the present Supreme Court Building at 1 Supreme Court Lane, the Chief Justice formally appointed the new building as a place where the Court of Appeal sits by way of a notification dated 20 June 2005.

== Jurisdiction ==
The Court of Appeal is solely an appellate court. It hears only appeals from lower courts, and does not deal with any trials or other first-instance matters, that is, matters coming to court for the first time.

=== Appellate civil jurisdiction ===
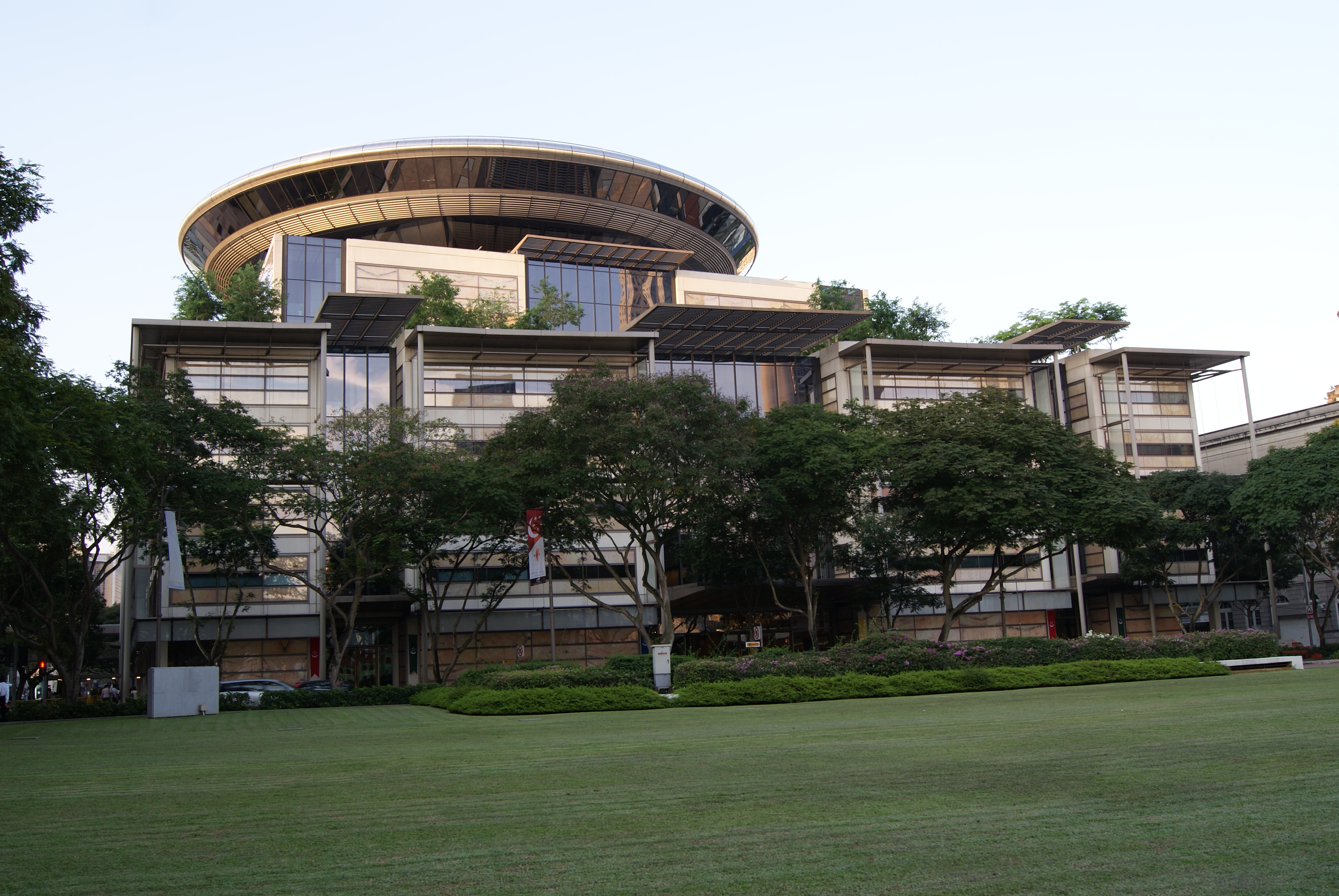
The Supreme Court Building, photographed in August 2010. The disc-shaped structure at the top of the building houses the courtroom of the Court of Appeal.

In general, the Court hears civil appeals from judgments or orders of the General Division of the High Court falling within the subject matters in the Sixth Schedule of the Supreme Court of Judicature Act 1969. These can be decisions made by the High Court when exercising its original jurisdiction (in other words, cases beginning in the High Court itself) or its appellate jurisdiction (cases appealed to the High Court from the State Courts). However, this general rule is subject to a number of restrictions. No appeal may be brought from certain interlocutory orders made by the High Court, when a judgment or order is made with the parties' consent, and where a statute declares that a judgment or order of the High Court is final. In some other cases, an appeal may only be brought with the leave of a High Court judge. These include cases where the amount or value of the subject-matter at the trial was S$250,000 or less, and High Court appeals concerning the adoption of children, the making of protection orders to prevent family violence, and maintenance for wives and children.

Appeals from the Appellate Division to the Court of Appeal are allowed only with the permission of the latter, which may only be given in cases which raise a point of law of public importance. In addition, the Court of Appeal may allow the transfer to itself of an appeal made to the Appellate Division.

Appeals to the Court are by way of rehearing. The Court is not required to accept any findings of fact or law made by the High Court, but hears afresh the parties' submissions on the issues in the appeal and comes to an independent decision. However, the Court relies on the evidence that was adduced in the court below and only permits new evidence to be admitted on special grounds. During an appeal, the Court possesses all the powers and duties of the High Court, and has "full power to determine any question necessary to be determined for the purpose of doing justice in any case before the Court". In particular, the Court has power to order a new trial on any issue by the High Court, except that the fact that the High Court improperly admitted or rejected evidence shall not be grounds for a new trial unless the Court of Appeal is of the view that some substantial wrong or miscarriage of justice was caused. The Court of Appeal may only order a new trial, or reverse or substantially vary a High Court judgment or order on significant grounds. It will not act in this manner on the basis of immaterial errors, defects or irregularities that do not affect the merits of the case or the jurisdiction of the High Court.

=== Appellate criminal jurisdiction ===
==== Criminal appeals ====
The Court of Appeal only hears appeals from decisions of the High Court made when the latter is exercising original criminal jurisdiction. In other words, matters heard by the High Court on appeal from the State Courts cannot be further appealed to the Court of Appeal, though questions of law may be reserved for determination by the Court (see below). People convicted in the High Court can appeal against the conviction, the sentence or both. The exception is that people who pled guilty may only appeal the extent or legality of the sentence. In the latter situation, the Court of Appeal may nonetheless permit the person who pleaded guilty to appeal against conviction if it believes that this is in the interests of justice. The Public Prosecutor may appeal against an acquittal or the sentence imposed on an accused person. The Court is entitled to summarily reject an appeal if the grounds of appeal do not involve any question of law, the conviction is supportable by the evidence, and there is nothing in the circumstances of the case which raises a reasonable doubt as to whether the conviction was right or leads the Court to think the sentence should be reduced. The summary rejection of an appeal may only be done upon the unanimous decision of the Judges of Appeal.

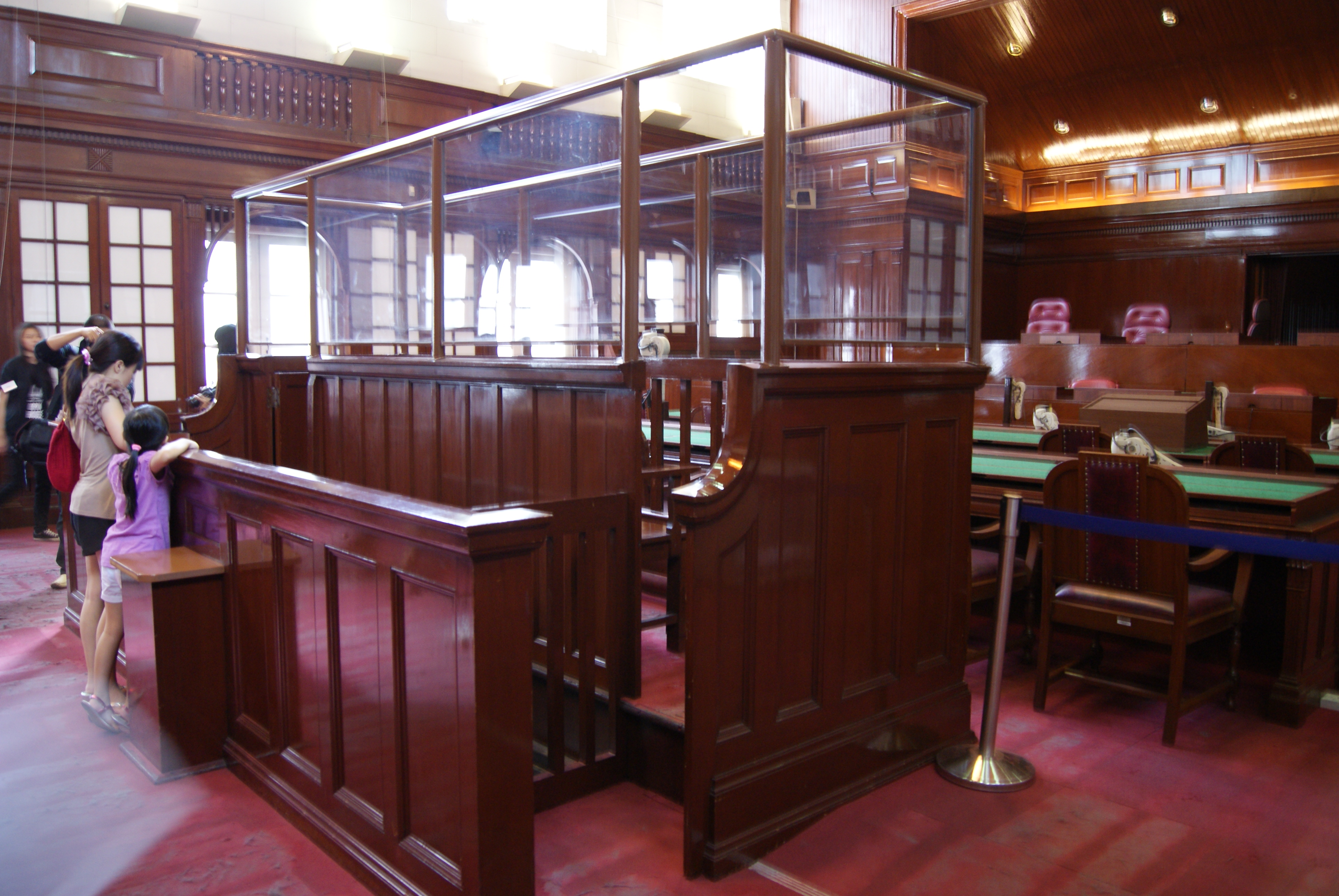
The dock of the Court of Appeal courtroom in the Old Supreme Court Building, where accused persons would sit during criminal appeals

If it is of the view that additional evidence is required, the Court may either take this evidence itself or order the trial court to take it. The Court may also ask the trial court to give a report of any matter relating to the trial.

Following the hearing of an appeal, the Court may confirm, reverse or vary the trial court's decision. It may also order a retrial; inform the High Court of its opinion on a matter and send it back to that court for further proceedings to be taken; or make any other order as it thinks just, exercising any power that the trial court might have exercised. The Court also has power to quash the sentence passed by the trial court and substitute a more or less severe sentence in its place. A trial court's judgment, sentence or order may only be reversed or set aside if it was legally incorrect or against the weight of the evidence. A sentence may only be altered if it is manifestly excessive or inadequate in the circumstances of the case. Even if the Court feels that a point raised in an appeal might be decided in the appellant's favour, it may dismiss the appeal if it considers that no substantial miscarriage of justice took place. The Court generally only issues a single judgment, though separate judgments may be given if the presiding Judge of Appeal so directs.

In the 2009 decision Yong Vui Kong v. Public Prosecutor, the Court left open the issue of whether it had inherent jurisdiction following the conclusion of an appeal to reopen the matter if new evidence came to light. It expressed the view that "it would be in the interest of justice that the court should have the power to correct the mistake, rather than rely on the Executive to correct what is essentially an error in the judicial process", and that it is "reasonable to assume that the court is better placed to evaluate the merits of the new evidence than the Executive". In earlier cases the view had been taken that in the interests of finality, after delivering its judgment in an appeal the Court should be regarded as functus officio, that is, it has fully "performed its office" and no longer has any legal power to act. However, in Yong Vui Kong the Court said:

[T]he finality principle should not be applied strictly in criminal cases where the life or liberty of the accused is at stake as it would subvert the true value of the judicial process, which is to ensure, as far as possible, that the guilty are convicted and the innocent are acquitted. The floodgates argument should not be allowed to wash away both the guilty and the innocent.

A possible argument, which had not yet been posed to the Court, was that Article 93 of the Constitution, which vests the judicial power of Singapore in the Supreme Court, conferred on the Court of Appeal the power to reopen concluded appeals. Although judicial power is only exercisable when the court has jurisdiction in a matter, "where the SCJA [Supreme Court of Judicature Act] does not expressly state when its jurisdiction in a criminal appeal ends, there is no reason for this court to circumscribe its own jurisdiction to render itself incapable of correcting a miscarriage of justice at any time".

==== Determination of questions of law ====
If a person has been convicted by the High Court, the trial judge and the Public Prosecutor may reserve for the Court of Appeal's decision any questions of law that arose during the trial that would affect its outcome. Any other party to the proceedings may also apply for the trial judge to state a case on a question of law for the Court of Appeal's determination, and if the judge declines to do so the party may apply to the Court of Appeal to direct the trial judge to state a case. During a State Court trial, instead of applying for the trial judge to state a case for the High Court's opinion, a party to the proceedings may apply to the Court of Appeal for leave for a case to be stated directly to that Court.

Upon a review of the case, the Court of Appeal will make a determination on the question and may then alter the sentence passed, pass a sentence, or give such judgment or make such order as it deems fit. The Court of Appeal exercises a similar power to determine questions of law reserved for its decision by the High Court or the Public Prosecutor after the High Court has heard an appeal from a State Court or has exercised its revisionary jurisdiction. Any question of law on which there is a conflict of judicial authority is deemed to be a question of public interest.

== Judicial precedent ==
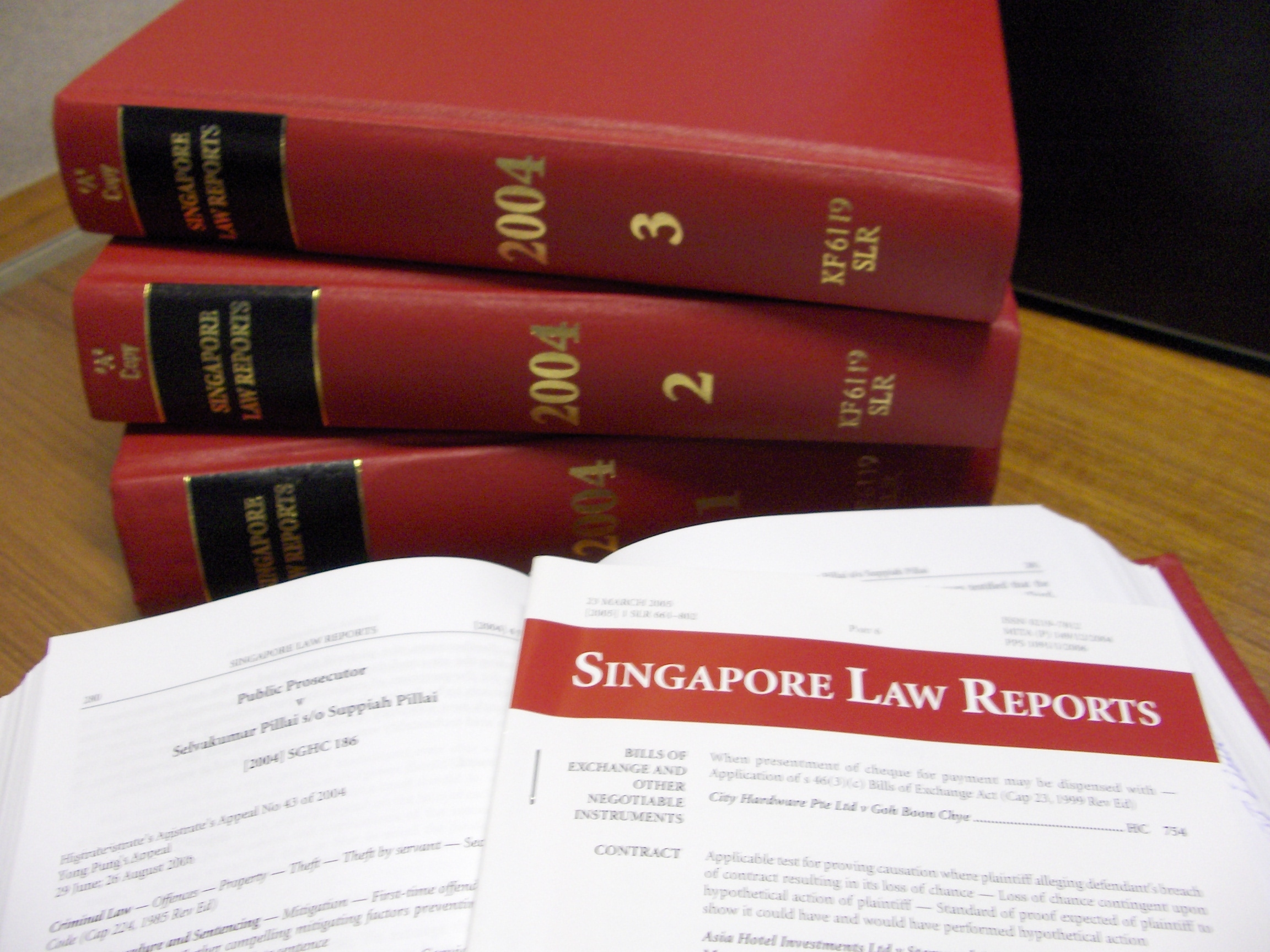
Copies of the Singapore Law Reports, Singapore's official series of law reports containing judgments of the Constitution of the Republic of Singapore Tribunal, Court of Appeal and High Court

As the highest court of Singapore and its final appellate court, under the principles of stare decisis (judicial precedent) decisions of the Court of Appeal are binding on the High Court and State Courts. Even if judges in these courts disagree with the reasoning given by the Court of Appeal in particular cases, they are required to apply the legal principles laid down in those cases.

The Court of Appeal became Singapore's final appellate court following the abolition of all appeals to the Privy Council with effect from 8 April 1994. On 11 July that year, the Court handed down a practice statement declaring that it would regard itself free to depart from previous decisions of its own or of the Privy Council

in any case where adherence to such prior decisions would cause injustice in a particular case or constrain the development of the law in conformity with the circumstances of Singapore. Therefore, whilst this court will continue to treat such prior decisions as normally binding, this court will, whenever it appears right to do so, depart from such prior decisions. Bearing in mind the danger of retrospectively disturbing contractual, proprietary and other legal rights, this power will be exercised sparingly.

The Court justified this new principle on the basis that "the political, social and economic circumstances of Singapore have changed enormously since Singapore became an independent and sovereign republic. The development of our law should reflect these changes and the fundamental values of Singapore society."

Where the President has referred to the Constitution of the Republic of Singapore Tribunal a question concerning the Constitution's effect on a bill, no court – including the Court of Appeal – may subsequently question the Tribunal's opinion on the bill or, assuming the bill is found to be constitutional, the validity of any law based on the bill.

== See also ==
- Judicial system of Singapore
- Supreme Court of Singapore
- High Court of Singapore
- State Courts of Singapore
- Family Justice Courts
- Law of Singapore
- Judicial officers of the Republic of Singapore
- Lawyers in Singapore
