= Lucien Wong =

Singaporean lawyer and attorney-general

The Honourable Lucien Wong SC
- 黄鲁胜
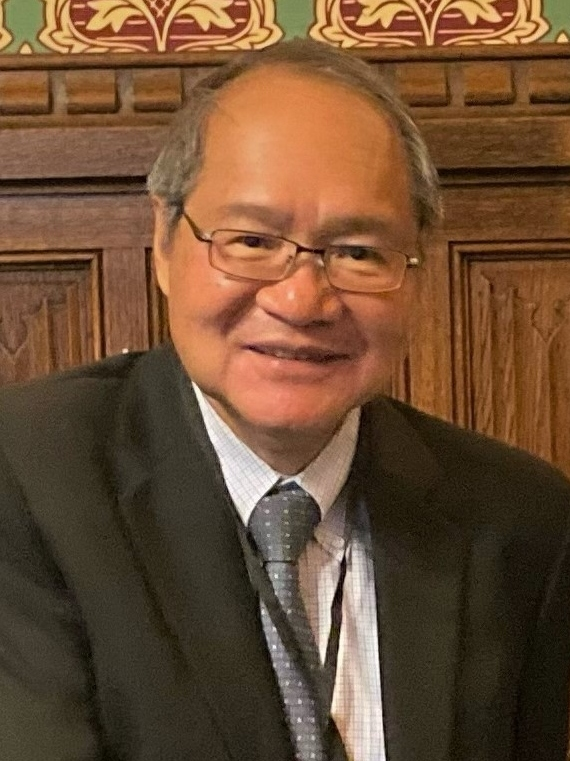
- Wong in 2022

9th Attorney-General of Singapore
- Incumbent
- Assumed office 14 January 2017
- Appointed by: Tony Tan
- Deputy: Tan Siong Thye (2015-2017); Lionel Yee; Hri Kumar Nair (2017-2023); Tai Wei Shyong; Ang Cheng Hock (2022-2025); Goh Yihan (2025-2026); Valerie Thean
- Preceded by: V. K. Rajah

Deputy Attorney-General of Singapore
- In office 19 December 2016 – 13 January 2017
- Appointed by: Tony Tan

Personal details
- Born: October 1953 (age 73) Colony of Singapore
- Children: 1
- Education: University of Singapore (LLB)

Lucien Wong
- Simplified Chinese: 黄鲁胜
Transcriptions
Standard Mandarin
- Hanyu Pinyin: Huáng Lǔshèng

Lucien Wong Yuen Kuai SC (born October 1953) is a Singaporean lawyer who has been serving as the ninth attorney-general of Singapore since 2017.

A former corporate lawyer, Wong was the chairman and a senior partner of Allen & Gledhill, as well as the chairman of the Singapore International Arbitration Centre and the Maritime and Port Authority of Singapore.

== Education ==
Wong graduated from the University of Singapore (now the National University of Singapore) with a Bachelor of Laws degree in 1978. He topped his final-year class.

== Career ==
=== Private practice ===
Wong was called to the Singapore Bar in 1979. He started as a legal assistant in Drew & Napier in 1980, becoming a partner in 1982. He then moved to Allen & Gledhill, where he was a partner from 1987 to 1998, before being appointed managing partner from 1998 to 2012, then chairman and senior partner. As a corporate lawyer for over three decades, he specialised in banking, corporate and financial services law. He also sat on law review committees, reviewing amendments to Singaporean company and securities law. As the personal lawyer of Lee Hsien Loong, the Prime Minister of Singapore, Wong represented him during the dispute with his siblings over Lee Kuan Yew's Oxley Road estate.

=== Public service ===
On 25 November 2016, the Prime Minister's Office announced Wong's appointment as Attorney-General. Wong would be Singapore's first Attorney-General without prior experience on the Bench nor in the Attorney-General's Chambers. Human rights lawyer Eugene Thuraisingam, who was later brought to Court by Wong, as Attorney-General, for scandalising the judiciary, said Wong’s lack of Bench and criminal law experience will have little bearing “because he is a top lawyer, one of the best”. He added: “He is a very highly regarded and respected lawyer who has been in practice for a very long time ... For criminal law, he will pick it up very fast. Generally, he has led one of Singapore’s most successful firms". Law Society president Thio Shen Yi described him as a "well-known corporate visionary" and Senior Counsel Lok Vi Ming said he had "few equals in the legal profession". Parliament also debated his age, as he would be 63 or three years older than the retiring V K Rajah when appointed; however, Law Minister K Shanmugam said that the appointment, being for a specified term, was "in accordance with Article 35 of the Constitution".

As a "transitional arrangement", Wong was appointed on 19 December 2016 as a Deputy Attorney-General and a Senior Counsel.

In 2017, the Singapore Democratic Party (SDP), an opposition political party in Singapore, wrote in to the President of Singapore, Tony Tan, urging him to revoke Wong's position as the Attorney-General as he had refused to look into Lee Wei Ling and Lee Hsien Yang's allegations that Lee Hsien Loong, Prime Minister of Singapore, had abused his powers and made false statements in Parliament. The SDP said that the association of Wong with Lee Hsien Loong prior to his becoming the Attorney-General has created an acute conflict of interest which cannot be ignored and any further delay or refusal to act will cause even greater erosion of confidence in Singapore's public institutions. The Prime Minister, however, had stated that the President had been informed of the connection between him and the appointed AG, and had no issues with it.

On 14 January 2017, he commenced his first three-year term as Singapore's ninth Attorney-General, succeeding V K Rajah. He was re-appointed for his second three-year term commencing on 14 January 2020 until 2023. On 26 September 2022, it was announced that Wong will be appointed for his third three-year term as Attorney General beginning on 14 January 2023 until 2026. On 10 October 2025, it was announced that Wong will be appointed for his fourth three-year term as Attorney General from 14 January 2026 until 13 January 2029.

=== Professional appointments ===
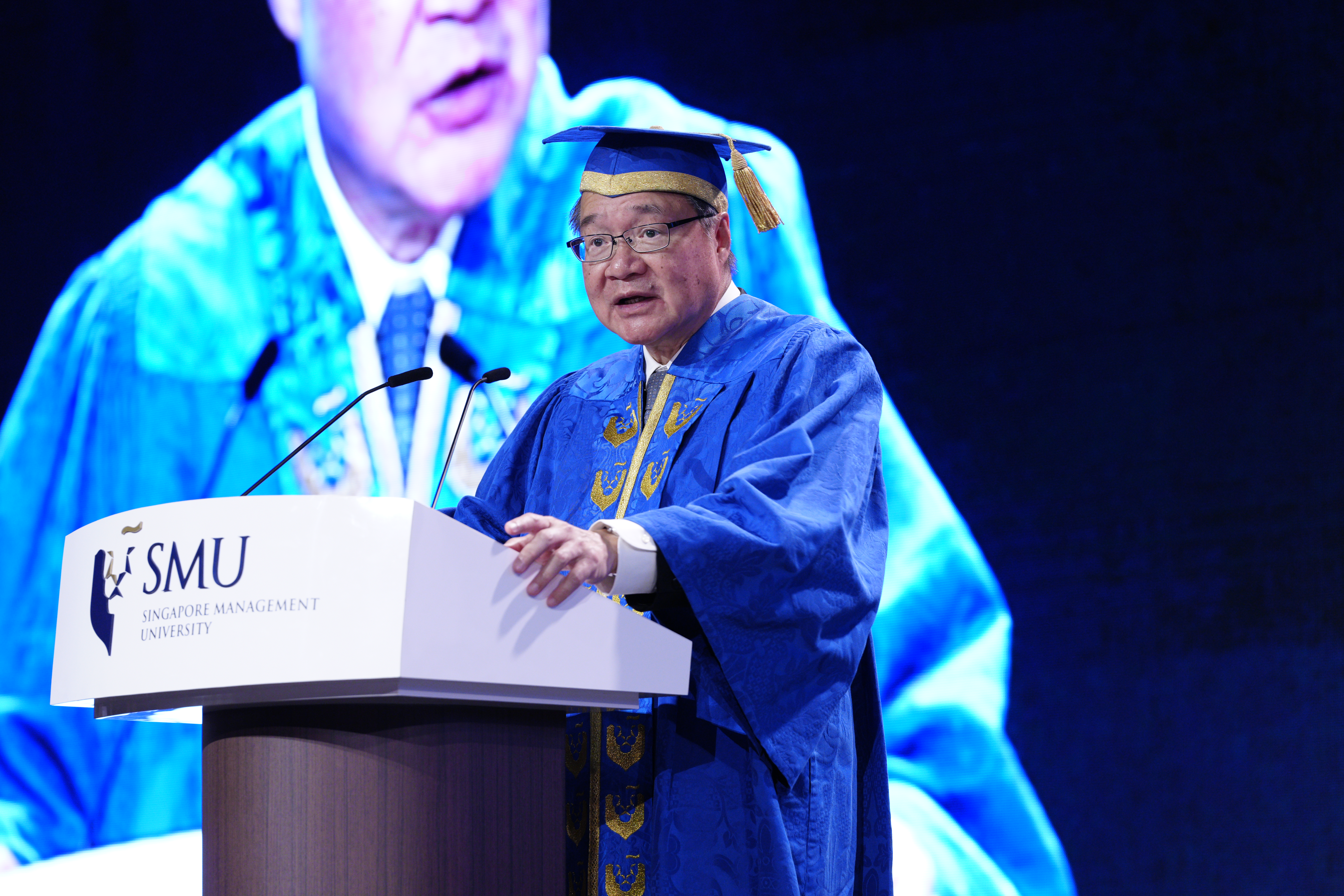
Wong speaking at the 2024 Commencement for Yong Pung How School of Law

Prior to his appointment as Attorney-General, Wong was the chairman of the Singapore International Arbitration Centre and the Maritime and Port Authority of Singapore. He was also a member of the Singapore Business Federation's board of trustees and director of Broadcom Limited, Singapore Health Services, Cerebos Pacific Limited, Singapore Technologies Engineering, Temasek Holdings, Singapore Press Holdings, Hap Seng Plantations, Singapore Airlines, Monetary Authority of Singapore, National University of Singapore, Capitaland and other companies.

Wong is currently a member of the Presidential Council for Minority Rights and was the former chairman of the Singapore Management University School of Law's advisory board.

== Personal life ==
Wong is married and has a son.
