= Allen & Gledhill =

Singapore law firm

Allen & Gledhill LLP
- Headquarters: Singapore
- No. of offices: 6
- Offices: Singapore, Myanmar, Vietnam, China, Malaysia (Rahmat Lim & Partners), Indonesia (AGI Legal)
- No. of lawyers: Allen & Gledhill network known as A&G Asia has over 650 lawyers, making it one of the largest law firm networks in the region
- Major practice areas: General practice
- Key people: Christina Ong (Chairman & Senior Partner); Jerry Koh (Managing Partner)
- Date founded: 1902; 124 years ago
- Founder: Rowland Allen; Joseph Gledhill
- Company type: Limited liability partnership
- Website: www.allenandgledhill.com

Allen & Gledhill LLP is a full service Singaporean law firm with a regional network of associate firms and offices known as A&G Asia. The firm has over 650 lawyers across its regional footprint and works with other leading law firms in the countries that they do not have a presence in. As the largest of Big Four law firms in Singapore, the firm is a regional market leader in many practices, particularly banking and finance, capital markets, corporate law, M&A law, and other transactional and advisory matters. The firm provides legal services to local companies and MNCs, financial institutions, and individual clients.

== History ==
Allen & Gledhill is one of Singapore's oldest law firms, founded by Rowland Allen and Joseph Gledhill in 1902. In 1959, it set up an office in Malaysia, which became independent in 1972. The Malaysian firm later merged with the firm Lee Hishammuddin to form Lee Hishammuddin Allen & Gledhill.

In November 2011, UK international law firm Allen & Overy indicated that it was exploring the possibility of a merger with the firm. The merger talks ended in March 2012.

Allen & Gledhill was reported by Asian Legal Business in 2021 to be the largest law firm in Singapore by headcount and the 44th largest domestic law firm in Asia.

== Accolades ==
Over the years, the firm has received numerous awards, including:

- International Financial Law Review (IFLR) Asia-Pacific Awards 2022 Regional Law Firm of the Year and being named National Law Firm of the Year (Singapore) 24 times since 2000.
- Chambers Asia-Pacific Awards 2022 Singapore Corporate & Finance Domestic Law Advisers award.
- The Legal 500 Southeast Asia Legal Awards 20/21 Regional Law Firm of the Year.
- The Legal 500 Southeast Asia Legal Awards 2023 Singapore Firm of the Year as well as Projects and Energy Law Firm of the Year.
- Asian Legal Business SE Asia Law Awards 2024 SE Asia Law Firm of the Year, Singapore Law Firm of the Year, Banking and Financial Services Firm of the Year, Labour and Employment Firm of the Year, Real Estate Law Firm of the Year, Restructuring Law Firm of the Year, Singapore Intellectual Property Law Firm of the Year, Tax and Trusts Law Firm of the Year, and Rising Law Firm of the Year (for its Myanmar office)

The firm was ranked as a leading law firm by Chambers & Partners in the Chambers Asia-Pacific 2024 for

1. Singapore in the areas of
  - Banking & Finance, Capital Markets, Competition/Antitrust, Construction, Corporate Investigations/Anti-Corruption, Corporate/M&A, Employment, Intellectual Property, Investment Funds, Projects & Energy, Real Estate, Restructuring/Insolvency, Shipping, Startups & Emerging Companies, Tax and Technology, Media, Telecoms.
2. Myanmar in the area of
  - General Business Law
3. Indonesia in the area of
  - Corporate & Finance (International Firms)

== Notable alumni ==
Allen & Gledhill is home to three Senior Counsels. Several Singapore politicians have worked there, including K. Shanmugam, Minister for Home Affairs and Minister for Law, and Edwin Tong, Minister for Community, Culture, and Youth.

Former managing partner, Lee Kim Shin, was appointed Judicial Commissioner of the Supreme Court in 2013. Former partner, Ang Cheng Hock, was appointed Judge of the Supreme Court in 2018. Former chairman and senior partner Lucien Wong, who was the only Singaporean lawyer to be named as one of Asia’s top 25 M&A lawyers by Asian Legal Business in 2009, was appointed Attorney-General of Singapore in December 2016. Former partner, Lai Siu Chiu was the first woman to be appointed judge in Singapore.
