= Constitution of the Republic of Singapore Tribunal =

Constitutional court

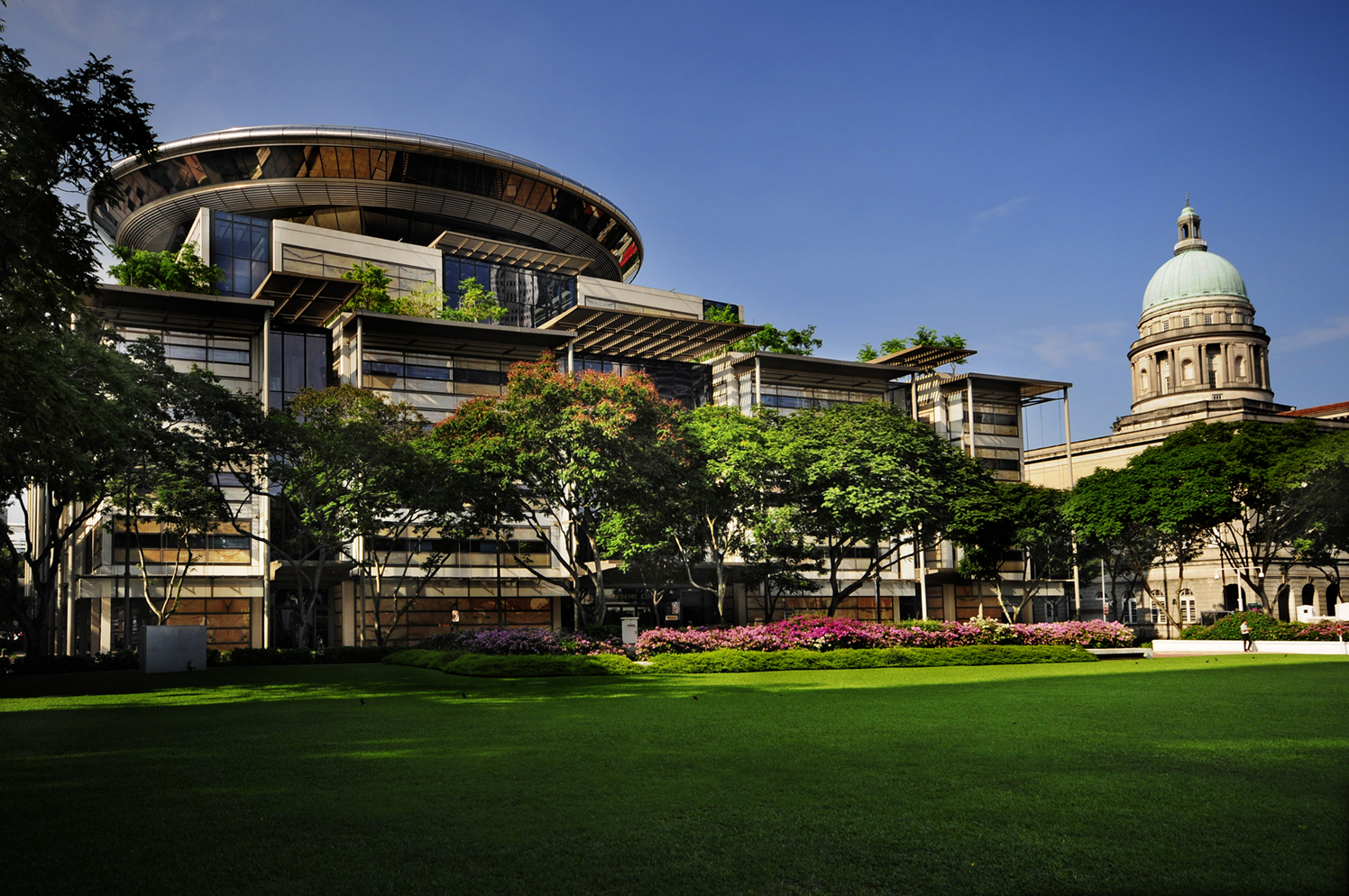
The Supreme Court Building, where the Constitution of the Republic of Singapore Tribunal sits, photographed on 24 May 2010. The dome of the Old Supreme Court Building is visible on the right.

The Constitution of the Republic of Singapore Tribunal is a tribunal established in 1994 pursuant to Article 100 of the Constitution of the Republic of Singapore. Article 100 provides a mechanism for the President of Singapore, acting on the advice of the Singapore Cabinet, to refer to the Tribunal for its opinion any question as to the effect of any provision of the Constitution which has arisen or appears to likely to arise. Questions referred to the Tribunal may concern the validity of enacted laws or of bills that have not yet been passed by Parliament.

Constitutional questions may also be referred to the Tribunal when Parliament attempts to circumvent or curtail the discretionary powers conferred on the President by the Constitution. If the attempt is by way of an ordinary bill, the President can exercise personal discretion to withhold assent to it. It is then open to Cabinet to advise the President to refer to the Tribunal the question whether the bill circumvents or curtails his discretionary powers. If the bill is determined by the Tribunal not to have that effect, the President is deemed to have assented to the bill on the day following the day when the Tribunal's opinion is pronounced in open court. When Article 5A of the Constitution is brought into force, a similar procedure will apply to attempts to circumvent or curtail the President's discretionary powers through a constitutional amendment. If the Tribunal rules that the proposed amendment does have the effect of restricting the discretionary powers of the President, the Prime Minister is entitled to submit the bill to a national referendum for approval.

The Tribunal consists of not less than three judges of the Supreme Court. Its opinions are binding on all other courts. Since the Tribunal was established in 1994, to date only one constitutional question has been referred to it. The Tribunal determined in 1995 that although Article 5(2A) was not in force, Article 22H(1) did not prevent Parliament from restricting the President's discretionary powers through a constitutional amendment. Since then, there have been several unsuccessful attempts to persuade Cabinet to invoke the Article 100 procedure.

== History ==
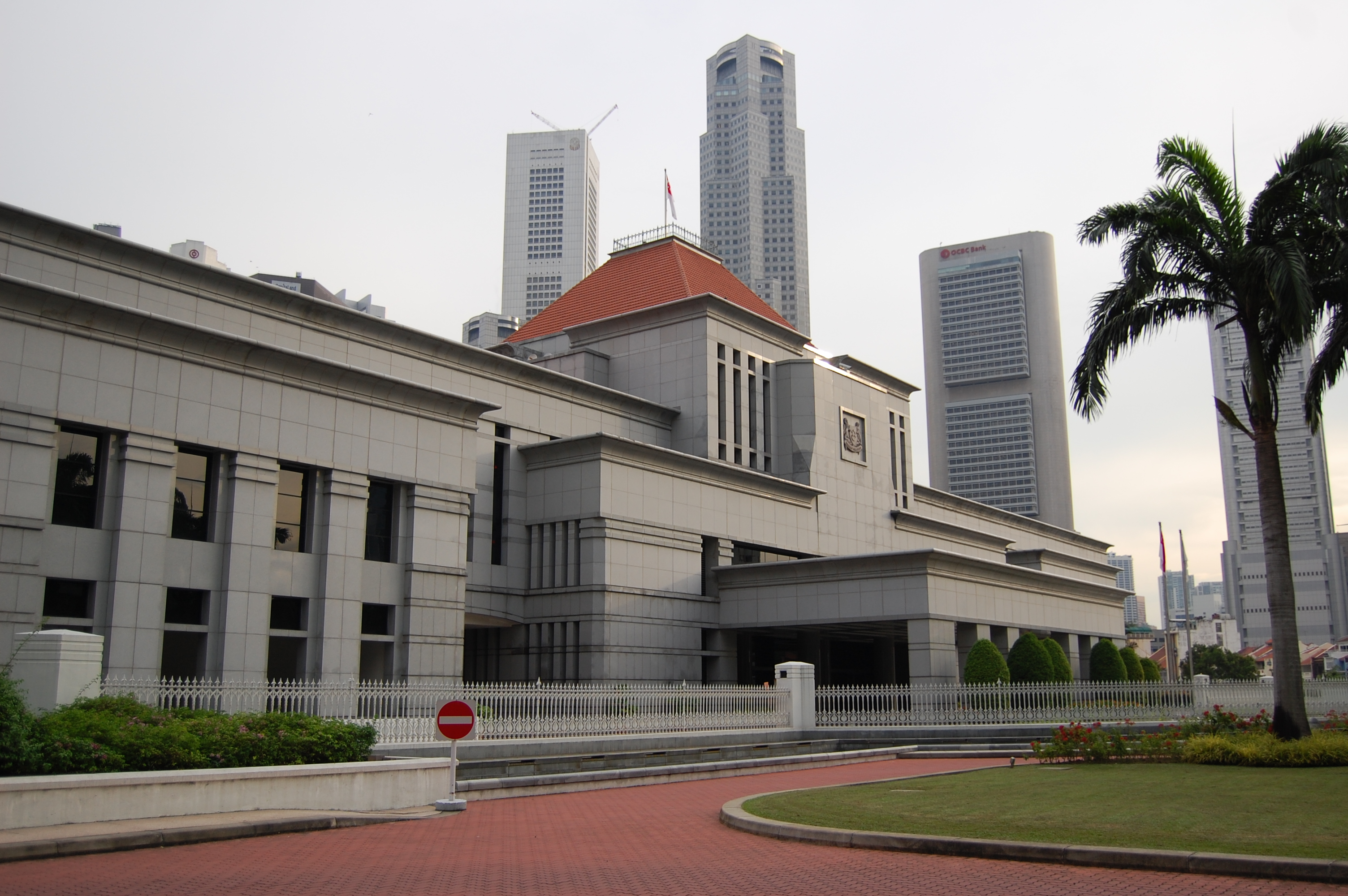
The Tribunal was established by a constitutional amendment enacted in 1994 by Parliament (Parliament House, photographed in December 2008, is pictured)

The Constitution of the Republic of Singapore Tribunal is an ad hoc tribunal established by Article 100 of the Constitution of the Republic of Singapore. Article 100 was introduced into the Constitution by the Constitution of the Republic of Singapore (Amendment No. 2) Act 1994, which was passed by Parliament on 25 August 1994 and assented to by President Ong Teng Cheong on 14 September 1994. It came into force on 1 October 1994.

Prior to the enactment of Article 100, Deputy Prime Minister Lee Hsien Loong noted during the Second Reading of the Constitution of the Republic of Singapore (Amendment No. 2) Bill that the Singapore Constitution had no provisions for referring questions of constitutional interpretation to the courts for an advisory ruling, especially those relating to new and complex provisions of the Constitution. Article 100 was intended to address this perceived lacuna in the Constitution.

One question of constitutional interpretation that was highlighted during the parliamentary debates pertained to the former Article 22H which had been incorrectly inserted into the Constitution by the Constitution (Amendment) Act 1991 in January 1991. Article 22H(1) provided that the President might, acting in his discretion, withhold his assent to any bill passed by Parliament (other than a bill to which Article 5(2A) applied) if the bill provided for the circumvention or curtailment of the discretionary powers conferred upon him by the Constitution. At that time, Article 5(2A), which entrenched certain core constitutional provisions (of which Article 22H(1) was one) by requiring the approval of the electorate at a national referendum for their amendment, had not been brought into force.

In August 1994, Parliament intended to amend Article 22H to restrict the President's powers thereunder to only non-constitutional bills which provided for the circumvention or curtailment of the President's discretionary powers conferred upon him by the Constitution. Because Article 5(2A) was not in force, a question arose as to whether the President had the power under Article 22H(1) to withhold his assent to any bill seeking to amend any of the provisions referred to in Article 5(2A), and specifically to any bill seeking to amend Article 22H. President Ong Teng Cheong stated that in the interest of testing out the system, he wished to have this question referred to the courts for a ruling, and that he would accept as correct whatever interpretation of Article 22H was given by the court. In response to his request, Article 100 was inserted into the Constitution by Parliament for that purpose.

== Reference of constitutional questions ==
=== Grounds for bringing of reference ===
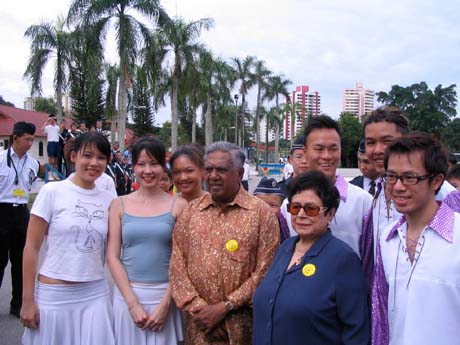
President S.R. Nathan and his wife Urmila Nandey with young people in July 2005. The President refers constitutional questions to the Tribunal on the advice of Cabinet and not of his own accord.

A constitutional question can be referred to the Tribunal on three grounds. First, under Article 100 itself, the President, acting on the advice of Cabinet, may refer to the Tribunal for its opinion any question as to the effect of any provision of the Constitution which has arisen or appears to the President likely to arise. During the parliamentary debates preceding the introduction of Article 100, Nominated Member of Parliament Associate Professor Walter Woon posed the following question:

The President can only refer a constitutional question to the tribunal on the advice of the Cabinet. He has no discretion to refer it himself. If you are going to give the power to the President to clear up constitutional ambiguities, would it not be better to allow him to make the reference himself when he sees there is an ambiguity, rather than to constrain it only to situations where Cabinet sees there is an ambiguity?

The reply by the Deputy Prime Minister Lee Hsien Loong was threefold:

- Article 100 was drafted by following the precedent in the Constitution of Malaysia. Since it had worked for Malaysia, the drafters thought it safe for Singapore to follow suit.
- It was the intention of legislation concerning the elected President that the initiative to refer the question to the Tribunal should lie with the Government, and generally not with the President whose recourse was in vetoing the legislation. The Cabinet would advise the President and the matter would then be referred to the Tribunal.
- In the event of Cabinet wishing to ride roughshod over the President's views and refusing to refer a particular matter, there would be considerable public pressure exerted on the Government to so refer.

Questions referred to the Tribunal may concern the validity of enacted laws or of bills that have not yet been passed by Parliament.

The other two grounds relate to attempts by Parliament to circumvent or curtail the discretionary powers conferred on the President by the Constitution. Article 22H of the Constitution deals with attempts to alter the President's powers by introducing an ordinary bill. If this occurs, the President may exercise personal discretion to withhold assent to the bill. The Cabinet may, if it wishes, advise the President to refer to the Tribunal the question whether the bill in fact has the effect of circumventing or curtailing his discretionary powers. If the Tribunal determines that the bill does not have that effect, the President is deemed to have assented to the bill on the day following the day when the Tribunal's opinion is pronounced in open court.

When Article 5A is brought into force, the President will also be able to decline to assent to a bill seeking to amend the Constitution that has a direct or indirect effect of circumventing or curtailing his discretionary powers. In this case, the Cabinet may also advise the President to refer to the Tribunal the question of whether the bill indeed has this effect. If the Tribunal rules that the bill does not have this effect, the President is deemed to have assented to the bill on the day immediately following the day when the Tribunal pronounces its opinion in open court. On the other hand, if the Tribunal decides to the contrary, the Prime Minister may opt to submit the bill to the electorate. If the bill is supported at a national referendum by not less than two-thirds of the total number of votes cast, the President is deemed to have assented to the bill on the day immediately following the day when the results of the referendum have been published in the Government Gazette.

=== Procedure ===
A reference must be made under the hand of (that is, signed by) the President, and must be served on the Attorney-General. The Attorney-General is required to assist the Tribunal in the hearing of the reference, and the President may be represented by such legal counsel as the Tribunal may appoint, after consulting the President. The parties appearing before the Tribunal are not confined to the President and the Attorney-General. The Tribunal may direct that the hearing of a reference be notified to any interested person or, where there is an interested class of persons, to one or more representatives of the class. If there is any interest that is affected which is not represented by counsel, the Tribunal may request that counsel argue the case for this interest.

The reference must state the questions on which the Tribunal's opinion is required in a form which allows, as far as possible, answers to be given in the affirmative or the negative. There must also be a concise statement of facts, and documents must be included, as are necessary to enable the Tribunal to decide the questions referred. During the hearing of a reference, the procedure in proceedings before the Court of Appeal applies. The President of Singapore is treated as the appellant and all other parties as respondents. However, the Tribunal is not bound by strict rules of evidence. The proceedings of the Tribunal, except for the hearing for directions, are held in open court. No party to any proceedings is ordered to pay any costs, and no court fees are payable in respect of any proceedings.

The Tribunal has to consider and answer a question referred to it not more than 60 days after the date of such reference. The Tribunal is mandated to certify to the President for his information its opinion on the question referred to it with reasons for its answer, and any Tribunal judge who differs from the opinion of the majority shall similarly certify his opinion and his reasons. The opinion of the majority of judges is the opinion of the Tribunal, and is required to be pronounced in open court.

== Composition ==
The Constitution provides that the Tribunal must consist of not less than three judges of the Supreme Court, as Parliament intended that the Tribunal should have the same structure as the Court of Appeal. In practice, the Tribunal consists of the Chief Justice and not less than two other judges of the Supreme Court as the Chief Justice may determine. If for any reason the Chief Justice is unable to be a Tribunal member, the Tribunal must consist of not less than three Supreme Court judges. The Chief Justice is the President of the Tribunal and, in his absence, the presidency of the Tribunal is determined in accordance with the following order of precedence:

- the vice-presidents of the Court of Appeal;
- the Judges of Appeal (other than vice-presidents); and
- the Judges of the High Court.

Among themselves, the judges in each category rank according to the priority of their appointments to the Bench.

== Effect of opinions ==
Opinions of the Tribunal cannot be questioned by any court. This includes the Tribunal's view of the validity of any law, the bill of which has been the subject of a reference to a Tribunal.

== Invocations of the constitutional reference process ==
=== Constitutional Reference No. 1 of 1995 ===
Since the creation of the Tribunal in 1994, only one constitutional reference has been made to it. Constitutional Reference No. 1 of 1995 arose from the issue of the application of Article 22H(1) of the Constitution in relation to Article 5(2A), which was and is still not yet in force. The matter was referred by President Ong Teng Cheong to clarify the scope of the application of both Articles. The Government was represented by Chan Sek Keong and Soh Tze Bian of the Attorney-General's Chambers, and the Presidency by Joseph Grimberg and Walter Woon.

=== Attempted invocations ===
==== Rescue and assistance package for Indonesia ====
The first instance of a non-governmental attempt to put an issue before the Constitutional Tribunal came from Non-constituency Member of Parliament Joshua Benjamin Jeyaretnam. He challenged the constitutionality of Singapore's US$5 billion loan offer to Indonesia in November 1997 on the basis of Article 144(1) of the Constitution which states: "No guarantee or loan shall be given or raised by the Government, except under the authority of any resolution of Parliament with which the President concurs." Jeyaretnam interpreted this to mean that the giving of a loan required parliamentary and presidential approval. The Finance Minister Dr. Richard Hu Tsu Tau did not agree with Jeyaretnam's interpretation of the provision, and stated that the Attorney-General had given advice that the granting of loans and the purchase of securities of this type had the prior approval of two Presidents.

Subsequently, the Ministry of Finance stated that Article 144(1) applied only to the giving of guarantees or the raising of loans by the Government, and not the giving of loans. The Attorney-General Chan Sek Keong confirmed that this reading of the provision, which he characterized as reddendo singula singulis (Latin for "referring each to each"), was correct. The Attorney-General also suggested that Jeyaretnam bring the matter to the Tribunal, a procedure seemingly inconsistent with a rule which stipulates that a reference to the Tribunal shall be made under the hand of the President of Singapore. This issue was finally abandoned when Jeyaretnam refused to pay for the costs for referring the matter to the Tribunal and the Ministry of Law found it ludicrous that it was asked by Jeyaretnam to bear the costs.

==== Public Entertainments Act ====
On 20 January 1999, Jeyaretnam wrote to President Ong Teng Cheong requesting the reference of another constitutional question to the Tribunal. This was made on behalf of his client, opposition politician Chee Soon Juan, who had been charged for giving a public talk on 20 December 1999 without a licence under the Public Entertainments Act. The question involved the constitutionality of the Act. Jeyaretnam argued that the Act violated Articles 14(1)(a) and (b) of the Constitution, which enshrines freedom of speech and assembly.

The President, acting on the advice of the Cabinet, turned down the request. The reply to Jeyaretnam dated 29 January 1999 pronounced the request as "misconceived". The following reasons were given:

- The jurisdiction of the Tribunal should only be invoked "when there is no other forum available to a person who claims that his constitutional rights have been infringed to have such claim tested". The Tribunal was not a court of law, but only advisory in nature. Chee would be able to raise the same constitutional question at trial or on appeal as he had been charged under the Act.
- If the Tribunal were to come into the picture when the court had yet to resolve the matter, then this would "constitute an improper interference with the judicial power of the courts and the constitutional functions of the Public Prosecutor".

==== Misuse of Drugs Act ====
A plea for a review by the Constitutional Tribunal was sought as a last-ditch attempt to stave off the execution of drug trafficker Shanmugam Murugesu. Shanmugam's lawyer contended that his client's right to equal protection under Article 12 of the Constitution had been infringed. Referring to cases of six recent offenders similarly convicted under the Misuse of Drugs Act, Shanmugam's lawyer drew attention to the fact that those offenders had imported more than 700 grammes of cannabis, an offence which attracted the death penalty, but were eventually charged with possessing less than 500 grammes of cannabis which resulted only in a jail sentence. In contrast, Shanmugam, who had imported 1,029.8 grammes of cannabis, did not have the amount reduced and was sentenced to death. The plea was rejected by the President on 12 May 2005, one day before the execution date.

==== Legal status of the right to vote ====
Speaking in Parliament on 12 February 2009, Nominated Member of Parliament Thio Li-ann posed the question of whether the right to vote is a constitutional one and suggested that the Law Minister obtain an advisory opinion to clarify the point. This issue was briefly dealt with by the Minister who simply answered it in the affirmative, rendering the need for a resolution by the constitutional tribunal nugatory. Thio subsequently expressed the view that it would be desirable to ask the Constitutional Tribunal to give its authoritative opinion as the courts are the final arbiter on questions of constitutionality in Singapore.
