= Ang Cheng Hock =

Singaporean judge (b. 1970)

Ang Cheng Hock SC
- 洪清福

Justice of the Court of Appeal of Singapore
- Incumbent
- Assumed office 1 October 2025
- Appointed by: Tharman Shanmugaratnam

Judge of the High Court of Singapore
- In office 1 May 2025 – 1 October 2025
- Appointed by: Tharman Shanmugaratnam

Deputy Attorney-General of Singapore
- In office 1 October 2022 – 1 May 2025 Serving with Lionel Yee (since Jan. 2017 - present); Hri Kumar Nair (until Jan. 2023); Tai Wei Shyong (since Jan. 2021 - present)
- Appointed by: Halimah Yacob

Judge of the High Court of Singapore
- In office 1 August 2019 – 30 September 2022
- Appointed by: Halimah Yacob

Judicial Commissioner of Singapore
- In office 14 May 2018 – 31 July 2019
- Appointed by: Halimah Yacob

Personal details
- Born: 1970 (age 55–56)
- Education: National University of Singapore Faculty of Law (LLB); Yale Law School (LLM)

Ang Cheng Hock (Chinese: 洪清福; pinyin: Hóng Qīngfú; Pe̍h-ōe-jī: Âng Chheng-hok, born 1970), SC, is a current Judge of the Supreme Court of Singapore and a former Deputy Attorney-General of Singapore.

== Education ==
Ang graduated from the National University of Singapore Faculty of Law with an LLB in 1995. He topped his class and obtained a first class honours. While an undergraduate student, Ang and his team won the 1994 Philip C Jessup International Law Moot Court Competition.

Subsequently, Ang was awarded the inaugural Singapore Academy of Law Scholarship to pursue postgraduate studies at Yale Law School, where he obtained his LLM in 1998.

== Career ==
=== Legal career ===
Ang completed his pupillage (now known as practice training) in Allen & Gledhill under current Law Minister K Shanmugam and finished at the top of the Postgraduate Practical Law Course in 1996, when he was called to the Singapore Bar. He was then deployed as a Justices' Law Clerk in the Supreme Court.

In 1998, Ang was also called to the New York Bar.

After returning to Allen & Gledhill, Ang rose to become a partner. He practised in civil and commercial litigation, international arbitration and corporate-related disputes, and also appeared in insolvency-related litigation, shipping disputes and intellectual property disputes. In 2017, he was ranked Band 1 in litigation by Chambers and Partners, who noted that he "is very analytical; persuasive in his arguments and incisive in his submissions".

In 2009, Ang was appointed as a Senior Counsel. At 38, he was among the youngest lawyers to be appointed.

=== Judicial career ===
On 12 February 2018, Ang was appointed as a Judicial Commissioner of the Supreme Court of Singapore from 14 May 2018 for a period of 18 months. He was sworn in on 17 May 2018.

On 15 July 2019, Ang was appointed as a Judge of the High Court of Singapore from 1 August 2019. He was sworn in on 2 August 2019. In 2020, he decided the first High Court appeal brought under the new Protection from Online Falsehoods and Manipulation Act (POFMA), holding that the Government bore the burden of proof in POFMA proceedings.

On 26 September 2022, Ang was appointed as a Deputy Attorney-General of Singapore from 1 October.

On 2 April 2025, Ang was re-appointed as a Judge of the High Court of Singapore with effect from 1 May 2025. On 19 September 2025, Ang was appointed as a Judge of the Court of Appeal of Singapore, Singapore's highest court, with effect from 1 October 2025.

=== Professional appointments ===
Ang is the vice-chairman of the Singapore Academy of Law (SAL)'s professional affairs committee and chairman of the SAL's professional values chapter. He is also a board member of the Singapore Institute of Legal Education, member of the Supreme Court's Civil Justice Commission, and member of the Ministry of Law's Civil Justice Review Committee.

== Family ==
Ang is married.
