= Murder of Dexmon Chua =

2013 murder case in Singapore

Dexmon Chua Yizhi
- Born: Dexmon Chua Yizhi c. 1976; Singapore
- Died: 28 December 2013 (aged 37); Lim Chu Kang, Singapore
- Cause of death: Fatal assault
- Resting place: Singapore
- Occupation: Material analyst
- Known for: Victim of a murder case

Dexmon Chua Yizhi (Chinese: 蔡谊志; Pe̍h-ōe-jī: Chhòa Gī-chì; pinyin: Caì Yìzhì; c. 1976 – 28 December 2013) was a material analyst and Singaporean who was brutally murdered in Singapore by his former girlfriend's husband, Chia Kee Chen (Chinese: 谢其晋; Pe̍h-ōe-jī: Chiā Kî-chìn; pinyin: Xiè Qíjìn), who craved revenge on Chua for having an affair with his wife and had convinced two people to help him abduct and kill Chua. Chua's death was due to a grievous assault that caused severe fatal injuries. Dexmon Chua was 37 years old when he died at Lim Chu Kang on 28 December 2013.

Despite being found guilty of capital murder, Chia Kee Chen was initially sentenced to life imprisonment in 2017, before the highest court of Singapore passed the death penalty on Chia in 2018. Chia's best friend and accomplice, Chua Leong Aik (Chinese: 蔡良益; Pe̍h-ōe-jī: Caì Liông-ek; pinyin: Caì Liángyì), was jailed five years for abetting the abduction, while the final accomplice, Indonesian Febri Irwansyah Djatmiko, was never arrested and charged as he fled from Singapore and hid in Indonesia.

== Murder and background ==
On 28 December 2013, 53-year-old Singaporean businessman Chia Kee Chen, together with his 31-year-old Indonesian employee, Febri Irwansyah Djatmiko (born 25 February 1982), and Singaporean, Chua Leong Aik (Chia's best friend), kidnapped 37-year-old Dexmon Chua Yizhi from a carpark in Choa Chu Kang. They dragged him into their van, which they had earlier borrowed from an acquaintance of Chia's. While Chua Leong Aik drove the vehicle, Chia and Febri electrocuted and grievously assaulted the victim until he died. The attack was so severe that there were fractures to the face, jaw and eye socket, and the van's ceiling was covered in blood. Chia and Febri then abandoned Dexmon Chua's body in the SAFTI Live Firing Area at Murai Park Avenue, and then spent an hour cleaning the van at Chia's fish farm before returning it. The police later received a report from Dexmon Chua's family, who reported him missing.

Prior to the murder, in November 2012, Chia, who also owned a fish farm in Indonesia, discovered that his 47-year-old wife, Serene Goh Yen Hoon, was having an affair with Dexmon Chua (who was Goh's colleague). Chia demanded that Goh end the affair, which she first started with Dexmon Chua in July 2011 after the latter began to regularly send her back home from work. In February 2013, Chia discovered a Chinese New Year greeting mistakenly sent to his wife by Dexmon Chua over WhatsApp, which enraged him. He subsequently made threatening calls to the murder victim and stalked him twice throughout the year 2013 until Christmas Eve. He finally hatched a plan to kill Dexmon Chua. He planned the murder with Febri and Chua Leong Aik. Chia told Febri (who helped Chia run his Indonesian fish farm) that he should come to Singapore to help kill someone who had raped his wife, and that, if the murder was successful, Chia would set up a business for him in Tanjung Pinang.

After the murder, Chia went for a holiday trip to Malaysia with his wife and two daughters (then aged 18 and 22 respectively), while helping Febri to flee the country. Due to police investigations, Chia was identified and arrested on 31 December 2013 upon his return to Singapore. The next day, after leading the police to where he disposed of the victim's body, Chia was charged with murder and placed under remand pending his trial.

64-year-old Chua Leong Aik, who acted as the driver, was subsequently arrested on 9 January 2014 and charged with murder as well.

The Singapore Police Force also placed Febri's name on the wanted list. Interpol also issued a red notice for Febri's arrest, and Febri became one of the fugitives on top of Interpol's wanted list. Later, Febri was located by Indonesian authorities in Bintan and was taken into custody, but as there was no extradition treaty between Indonesia and Singapore, Febri was not taken back to Singapore for trial; however, his police statements would be given to the court during Chia's murder trial.

== Trial of Chua Leong Aik ==
Some time after he was charged, Chua Leong Aik's murder charge was reduced to abduction and causing grievous hurt. Nearly two years later, on 8 January 2016, Chua Leong Aik pleaded guilty to helping both Chia and Febri abduct and assault the victim. During mitigation, Chua Leong Aik's defence lawyer, James Ow Yong, asked for a jail term of four years, arguing that his client, who had two children aged seven and two in Indonesia after he remarried, was mostly a law-abiding citizen. He also noted that Chua Leong Aik had nothing to gain and was trying to help a friend, and thus played a minimal role in the entire incident. Deputy Public Prosecutor, Tan Wen Hsien, who pressed for a five-year sentence, rebutted that Chua Leong Aik had knowledge that a possibly vicious attack on a stranger would be conducted, given his awareness of the weapons that were used, so dismissed his supposed minimal role in the crime.

In his judgement, Senior Judge Kan Ting Chiu admonished Chua Leong Aik for his lack of remorse and not stopping the assault. He stated that Chua was not an instigator, but he did nothing to intervene, and he had denied his role or knowledge relating to the murder at the moment he was arrested. Justice Kan ordered Chua Leong Aik to serve five years in prison, which was the sentence sought by the prosecution. Chua Leong Aik was released from prison in 2021.

== Trial of Chia Kee Chen ==
=== High Court verdict ===
Chia Kee Chen was brought to trial in the High Court of Singapore for murder on 25 October 2016. The charge of murder Chia faced was not of intentional murder, which is solely punishable by death, but murder with an intention to fatally injure a person and cause death. This type of murder with no intention to kill warrants either life imprisonment or the death penalty if found guilty. During the trial, both Chia's wife and Chua Leong Aik testified against Chia.

Despite the prosecution's case and incriminating evidence against him, Chia denied that he abducted Chua for revenge for the affair Dexmon Chua had with his wife, and denied having taken part in the assault. Having cited that he had another wife and three more children in Indonesia, Chia stated that affairs are "very common in Singapore". He also stated he naturally felt enraged as a man if his wife had an affair. He put the blame on a Malaysian man named "Ali" for doing most of the harm to the victim, with Febri's help during the assault. He stated that he abducted Dexmon Chua for allegedly filming his wife having sex with the victim, and had wanted to retrieve the tapes to protect his wife's dignity. He stated he had never thought of revenge against Dexmon Chua.

The prosecution argued that Chia was lying in his account in the court and fabricated the existence of his fourth accomplice Ali, pointing out that both Febri and Chua Leong Aik did not tell the police about the participation of Ali in their kidnapping plan, and it was puzzling that Ali could not be contacted by phone but appeared in the accused's account at convenient moments. They stated that Chia had told police in his account of how he used the hammer to hit Dexmon Chua and he had clearly participated in the assault, with the inference from the unwashed blood patterns that the forensic experts discovered inside the van. They also pointed out that Chia had the motive to attack Dexmon Chua, since he had ill feelings regarding the affair. The trial concluded on 3 November 2016 after seven days before the High Court.

On 17 January 2017, Chia's defences were all rejected by High Court judge Choo Han Teck, who found Chia guilty of murder under Section 300(c) of the Penal Code. In convicting Chia, Justice Choo Han Teck noted that Chia had intentionally assaulted the victim together with Febri with the common intention to cause the fatal injuries to the victim. The judge labelled Chia an "unreliable witness", as there were many contradictions in his account, which only corroborated his guilt. He also rejected the allegation that there was a fourth man named Ali who helped assault Dexmon Chua, since Chia did not make any mention of Ali in his police statements. The judge stated that Chia played the most critical role in the case, as he was the one with the motive and hated Dexmon Chua. Sentencing for Chia was postponed till a later date.

The prosecution, led by DPP Tan Wen Hsien, sought the death penalty, due to the brutal and bloody nature of Dexmon Chua's murder and the cruel, savage, and callous execution of Chia's fatal assault on the victim. DPP Tan argued in her submissions that Chia had an utter lack of remorse for his actions and had acted in a calm and collected manner during the killing, which made it more appropriate for Chia to serve a death sentence. Tan also pointed out that he only confessed to using a hammer to hit Dexmon Chua ten days after the murder. The defence, led by defence lawyer Anand Nalachandran, argued for life imprisonment, as there was no conclusive evidence that Chia planned to murder Dexmon Chua. He also argued that there was only a plan to abduct, not to kill the victim, in contrast to Febri's account (which he made to the Indonesian police), which detailed a murder plan. Anand said Febri's account was "self-serving" and should not be accepted, as it was inconsistent with Chua Leong Aik's account of a non-fatal kidnap plot. The defence counsel also tried to claim Chia suffered from a mental disorder and had impaired responsibility to avoid capital punishment, which the prosecution rejected due to Chia being certified as mentally sound and normal prior to the trial.

On 4 August 2017, Chia was sentenced to life imprisonment, which fell short of the maximum penalty of death the prosecution sought. Justice Choo stated in his brief oral judgement (which was not published) that there was a possibility that Febri inflicted the fatal blow even though Chia had the motive and intention to kill, and the murder charge which Chia faced was under Section 300(c) of the Penal Code instead of Section 300(a) (under which the death penalty is mandatory if found guilty), which was why he decided not to pass a death sentence on Chia. The sentence was backdated to 1 January 2014, the date Chia was first remanded.

=== Prosecution's appeal and death sentence ===
After the conclusion of the trial, the prosecution, which was now led by DPP Hri Kumar Nair, appealed for the death penalty. After hearing the appeal, the Court of Appeal unanimously allowed the appeal on 27 June 2018 and raised Chia's life sentence to death, condemning him to hang on a later date for Dexmon Chua's murder.

The Court of Appeal, in sentencing Chia to death, citing the guiding principles set by the 2015 landmark appeal of the Kho Jabing case, stated that the unremorseful Chia had "exhibited such viciousness and such a blatant disregard for the life of the deceased, and are so grievous an affront to humanity and so abhorrent that the death penalty is the appropriate, indeed the only adequate sentence", given that he masterminded the abduction out of revenge for his wife's adultery, and had shown a high degree of premeditation and planning. They also dismissed his psychiatric report of diminished responsibility, since there was no contributory link between the offence and the alleged major depressive disorder; it also lacked reason and only contained ambiguity.

The three-judge panel, led by Chief Justice Sundaresh Menon, also stated that although it may be true that Febri could have inflicted the fatal injuries, he did so under Chia's directions, and Chia not only did not tell Febri to stop the assault, but joined in the attack. Before his arrest, Chia even calmly went for a holiday trip to Malaysia with his wife and two daughters while helping Febri to flee the country. They also pointed out that in his first statements to the police, Chia voiced to the police interrogators that his only regret was not causing Dexmon Chua more suffering before his death, showing that Chia was not remorseful for killing Dexmon Chua.

CJ Menon, who read out the judgement he made together with two other judges, Judith Prakash and Tay Yong Kwang, said that regarding Chia's role, "One who hires an assassin to kill another or who otherwise controls a killer, cannot be less culpable than the one who does the killing." Chia's appeal against his conviction was dismissed by the same three judges.

== Aftermath ==
When her daughter informed Dexmon Chua's elderly mother that her son's killer was sentenced to death, she made a comment in Chinese, "Justice is finally served for my son, but my beloved son will never come back to life anymore." She described her son, who was the second of her three children, as a filial and dutiful son who cared about his parents and always bought his parents' their favorite snacks to eat. She described her son's death as a huge blow, and she took it very badly when she heard that Chia was sentenced to life imprisonment instead of death. Dexmon Chua's mother had earlier begged for the prosecution to argue for the death penalty in their appeal against Chia's life term. The family of Dexmon Chua also had earlier told the press that they were not aware of Dexmon Chua's relationship with Chia's wife.

The prosecution's appeal of Chia Kee Chen's death sentence would be a landmark case that influenced the sentencing outcomes of other murder cases, as it led to more sentencing guidelines relating to murder under the death penalty laws of Singapore. Notably, in the case of Leslie Khoo Kwee Hock, who killed his girlfriend Cui Yajie, the High Court's judge, Audrey Lim, compared the case of Khoo with Chia's case, stating that Khoo did not premeditate the murder and his conduct, at the court's consideration, did not show any viciousness or blatant disregard for human life; therefore Khoo was sentenced to life imprisonment instead of death on 19 August 2019.

Chia Kee Chen was hanged sometime in 2019, and prison statistics confirmed that two people (including Micheal Anak Garing) were hanged in 2019 for murder. Chia was not among the 50 inmates remaining alive on Singapore’s death row in August 2023, and only three of these prisoners were held on death row for murder; (Iskandar Rahmat, Ahmed Salim and Teo Ghim Heng), while the remaining 47 were convicted of drug trafficking. Febri still remains on the run, with theories claiming he had returned to Indonesia.

In 2023, a Singaporean Tamil-language crime show titled Theerpugal, which meant "The Verdict" in Tamil, re-enacted the murder of Dexmon Chua, and it aired a total of two episodes covering the case. A lawyer confirmed that Chia's death sentence had been carried out, although the exact date of his execution in 2019 was not specified.

== See also ==
- Capital punishment in Singapore
- Life imprisonment in Singapore
- List of major crimes in Singapore
- List of cases affected by the Kho Jabing case
- Kho Jabing
- List of fugitives from justice who disappeared
