= Kujat =

Kujat is a surname. Notable people with the surname include:

- Galing Kujat (1983), convicted robber and a native Malaysian of Iban descent
- Harald Kujat (1942), retired German general of the Luftwaffe
- Masir Kujat (1954), Malaysian politician
