= Circuit Road flat murder =

2016 case of a nurse murdered by strangulation in Singapore

Zhang Huaxiang
- 张花香
- Zhang Huaxiang before her death
- Born: 6 November 1987; Xiangxi, Hunan, China
- Died: 21 March 2016 (aged 28); MacPherson, Singapore
- Cause of death: Murder by strangulation
- Resting place: Burial of ashes at sea in Singapore
- Other name: Princess Xiang Xiang (Nickname given by Boh)
- Education: Nursing course at Qingdao University (China); Nursing course at Singapore's Nanyang Polytechnic (Singapore)
- Occupation: Nurse
- Employer: National University Hospital

On 21 March 2016, 28-year-old Zhang Huaxiang (Chinese: 张花香; pinyin: Zhāng Huāxiāng; 6 November 1987 – 21 March 2016), a Chinese nurse working in Singapore, was murdered by her close male friend Boh Soon Ho (Chinese: 卜顺和; Pe̍h-ōe-jī: Poh Sūn-hô), a Malaysian working as a cafeteria worker in Singapore. Boh's motive behind the murder was jealousy over Zhang, whom he considered his girlfriend, although she did not reciprocate his feelings and had been going out with another man. Boh used a towel to strangle Zhang in a fit of anger, and he even tried having sex with her corpse.

After the killing, Boh escaped to his native state of Melaka before his arrest two weeks later. He was extradited to Singapore to face charges of murder, dishonestly misappropriating Zhang's belongings and attempting to have sex with her corpse. Three years later, Boh was brought to trial in September 2019 and for the charge of murdering Zhang, Boh was found guilty and sentenced to life imprisonment on 8 February 2020, after the prosecution decided to not seek the death penalty given that the case did not show any viciousness or blatant disregard for human life in terms of Boh's conduct at the time of the murder.

Eight months after his sentencing, Boh lost his appeal against his conviction and hence, he is currently serving his life sentence at Changi Prison, where he has been incarcerated since April 2016. The Circuit Road murder case was later dramatized in Singapore crime show Crimewatch and the re-enactment aired as the first episode of the show's annual season in 2022.

== Death of Zhang Huaxiang ==
On 22 March 2016, the owner of a flat at Circuit Road discovered the dead body of a young woman inside the rented bedroom of one of his tenants. The corpse was on the bed and covered by a blanket. The owner quickly called the police. The forensic pathologist Chan Shi Jia of the Health Sciences Authority, who examined the body, estimated that the time of death was about 24 to 36 hours ago, and the cause of death was likely strangulation.

The woman was identified as Zhang Huaxiang, a 28-year-old nurse who was working at the National University Hospital (NUH). Zhang, who was born on 6 November 1987 at a village in Hunan, was a graduate of Qingdao University, where she studied nursing. She first came to Singapore in 2009 after receiving a scholarship to study nursing at Nanyang Polytechnic, and after completing her studies, she was employed as a nurse at NUH in 2013. Her colleagues and friends described her as a good-natured person at work and social life. According to Zhang's uncle Sun Daiquan (aged 48 in 2016), Zhang was the pride of their village back in China due to her becoming the first person from the village to receive a scholarship and study overseas. Zhang also had at least one younger sister.

According to her village's traditions, Zhang cannot be buried at the village since unmarried women should not be laid to rest at the village's cemetery, hence her body was cremated and her ashes were scattered into the sea. Undertaker Roland Tay, who was known for providing funeral services to murder victims like Huang Na, Yang Jie and Liu Hong Mei, generously helped Zhang's family to carry out her funeral and cremation.

== Murder investigations and arrest ==
=== Boh's confession ===
The police investigations classified Zhang Huaxiang's death as an unnatural death, and they found out from the owner that the room (where Zhang was found dead) was rented to a Malaysian man named Boh Soon Ho, who was 47 years old and Zhang's close friend, with whom she used to work together at a cafeteria. At the time of the discovery, Boh, who was a Singapore permanent resident, had left for Malaysia, claiming he would be going back to open a business and would not rent his room. According to the landlord, the police also found out that Boh had one-sided feelings for Zhang. Boh was thus considered as a possible suspect behind Zhang's death.

A few days later, the landlord received a call from Boh, who confessed to killing Zhang due to Zhang allegedly cheating on him. The landlord informed the police and helped them keep tabs of his messages and phone calls made between him and Boh Soon Ho, who later told him he was in his hometown at the Malaysian state of Melaka, and lived at a hotel. Boh also revealed that he first went to his younger sister's home and confessed to her that he killed Zhang, whom he introduced to many people as his girlfriend. As his younger sister refused to let him stay or help him, Boh hid at the hotel. During the time he conversed with Boh, the landlord tried to convince Boh to return to Singapore to surrender himself, but Boh refused to for fear of being sentenced to death for murdering Zhang.

=== Boh's capture by the Royal Malaysia Police ===
With the information given by Boh's landlord, the investigators of the Singapore Police Force contacted the Royal Malaysia Police (or the Polis DiRaja Malaysia) for their assistance to capture Boh, and they also obtained a warrant of arrest to facilitate their arrest of Boh outside the jurisdiction of Singapore. The Malaysian police helped in the investigations and eventually traced Boh's whereabouts in Melaka.

On 4 April 2016, two weeks after the murder of Zhang Huaxiang, her killer – 47-year-old Boh Soon Ho – was arrested at a restaurant in Melaka, where he was having dinner before the Malaysian police officers ambushed and captured him. Boh was handed over to the Singaporean police officers and extradited back to Singapore the next day. Boh was officially charged with murder on 7 April 2016 and remanded for police investigations.

Upon hearing that Boh was arrested for the murder of their elder daughter, Zhang's parents expressed to the Chinese newspaper Lianhe Zaobao that the whole family and their relatives in China found closure with Boh being brought to justice, and they stated with hope that Zhang would rest in peace with the assurance that her killer was caught. The Singapore Police Force also thanked the Royal Malaysia Police for their help in arresting Boh, which they stated was attributed to the many years worth of relationship between both countries' policemen in assisting one another in arresting the suspects sought by either one of the nations.

== Boh Soon Ho ==

Boh Soon Ho, who had a younger sister, was born and raised in an ethnic Chinese family in Melaka, Malaysia, in 1968. His mother committed suicide when he was three years old, and he mostly grew up under the care of his grandmother and other relatives, and while he maintained a close relationship with his father, Boh did not have a good relationship with his stepmother after his father's remarriage.

Since young, Boh did not perform academically well in his studies, and he thus dropped out of school in Secondary 2. After he left school, Boh began working for his father, who owned a furniture business. Boh first came to Singapore to work upon reaching adulthood. After working in Singapore for a number of years, Boh applied for permanent residency and he successfully obtained it. Prior to him first meeting Zhang, Boh had two former relationships, with each lasting a few months.

The background of Boh's relationship with Zhang Huaxiang was revealed during the trial proceedings. It was revealed that both of them first met in 2011 or 2012 when they both worked at the cafeteria at Marina Bay Sands integrated resort, and Zhang was at that time, studying a nursing course under a scholarship. Zhang eventually left her part-time cafeteria job to become a nurse, but she and Boh continued their friendship with one another, and they often going out for meals or watching movies together.

The closeness between Zhang and Boh eventually made Boh develop one-sided romantic feelings for Zhang, after one occasion where Zhang fed him popcorn while they were at a cinema watching a film. However, Zhang only regarded Boh as a close male friend, and Boh was too timid to ask her out and be his girlfriend. Three to four years after they first met, Boh proposed to Zhang and asked her to marry him, but Zhang did not reply to him, and their friendship remained all the same.

== Trial ==
The Circuit Road murder trial began at the High Court on 18 September 2019, with both the leading criminal lawyer Eugene Thuraisingam and his colleague Chooi Jing Yen representing Boh Soon Ho, who was then 51 years old. High Court Judge Pang Khang Chau was assigned to hear the case, and the prosecution – consisting of Wong Kok Weng and Joshua Chua – proceeded with the charge of murder by intentionally causing a bodily injury that could lead to death in the ordinary cause of nature. Should Boh be found guilty of this charge of murder, he could receive either the death penalty or life imprisonment. Boh also faced two charges of having sexual intercourse with a corpse and dishonest misappropriation of a deceased person's property, which warrant sentences of up to five years' jail, and up to three years' jail respectively, in combination to a possible fine for either one or both of these offences.

=== Boh's account and defence ===
Boh, who recounted his past and relationship with Zhang on the stand, revealed in court that on 18 March 2016, three days before the date of Zhang Huaxiang's murder, he happened to see a man together with Zhang outside her flat. Zhang had been seeing Boh less and less since January 2016, and in combination with his prior suspicion relating to this, Boh grew more certain that Zhang was seeing someone else and began to think that she was cheating on him, despite their true relationship being not lovers from the start. This sighting also made Boh angered at how Zhang did not reciprocate his feelings after thinking of the huge sum of money he spent on her meals and gambling.

On 21 March 2016, Boh invited Zhang to come to his landlord's flat at Circuit Road for lunch. After their meal of steamboat, Boh began making advances on Zhang, wanting to become physically intimate with Zhang, who rejected his advances and called him crazy. Then, Boh confrontationally asked her about the man he had seen her with. She told him that it was a man from China, with whom she went out together for a few times and whom she had interest in, and she added that her former boyfriend had come to visit her from China and it was normal for them to be intimate. As a result of this answer, Boh became furious and he took a blue towel from his bathroom to wrap around Zhang's neck and strangle her from behind, which caused Zhang to die from suffocation.

Upon seeing Zhang's lifeless body, Boh took off Zhang's clothes and placed the body on his bed, and proceeded to take photos of Zhang's nude corpse. Afterwards, Boh molested Zhang's corpse and tried to have sex with her dead body, but was unable to sustain his penile erection. Afterwards, Boh bought new luggage with intention to contain the body before abandoning it, but it could not fit as it had become stiff. Boh thus packed up his bags and left for Malaysia the next day, where he stayed on the run until his arrest on 4 April 2016.

Boh's lawyers Chooi and Thuraisingam argued that Boh should be liable to a defence of sudden and grave provocation, as Boh, who was deeply infatuated with Zhang, was provoked and angered by Zhang's comments of going out with someone else and did not reciprocate his feelings, and the overwhelming sense of rage and jealousy caused Boh to suffer from a loss of self-control and he consequently strangled Zhang to death. They also argued that with Boh's low IQ of 74, and his lack of experience with women and low social skills, this also contributed to Boh's reaction to Zhang's comments and thus lead to this fatal outcome. Boh, who recounted his crime through a Chinese interpreter, also insisted that he only used the towel to "scare her", and had no intention to strangle Zhang or kill her despite having used the towel on her while his emotions get the better of him.

=== Prosecution's arguments ===
However, the prosecution argued that Boh did not carry out the strangulation out of impulse or in a moment of anger. They drew attention to the fact that the relationship between Zhang and Boh were not intimate and there was no basis for a person in Boh's position to feel provoked, and he committed the killing due to rage and jealousy, as a result of not having his desire of sex fulfilled and no reciprocation of his feelings. The prosecution's psychiatrist, Dr Stephen Phang of the Institute of Mental Health, revealed in his report that Boh was not suffering from a mental disorder that diminished his responsibility and there was no grave and sudden provocation, based on his decision to attempt to dispose of the corpse and prepare to escape from Singapore, which demonstrated his coolness and significant amount of self-control over his actions. Additionally, Boh's sexual assault of Zhang's corpse also proven that the defendant "was purposeful in his pursuits for personal pleasure", according to Dr Phang, who also disagreed that Boh was delusional in thinking his unrequited feelings for Zhang was love.

=== Conviction and sentencing verdict ===
On 7 February 2020, the trial judge Pang Khang Chau found Boh guilty of murder for the fatal strangulation of Zhang Huaxiang. He stated that Boh failed to prove that he killed Zhang out of grave and sudden provocation, due to him still possessing a significant amount of self-control at the time of the alleged provocation, though the judge still accepted that Boh was indeed provoked into doing the deed despite his extent of provocation not sufficiently grave enough to make him liable to a successful defence of sudden and grave provocation.

Besides that, Boh's relationship with Zhang was not mutual romance and it was also not sexual, so even with Boh's one-sided feelings for Zhang, Zhang's comment of her closeness with her ex-boyfriend could not be considered as a grave and sudden act of provocation to a reasonable person in Boh's position and contextually from the nature of their relationship. Given that the psychiatric evidence did not support the notion of Boh suffering from any abnormality of the mind or mental disorder, and it revealed that Boh was not intellectually disabled and had no problems with his daily functioning despite his low IQ of 74, the judge dismissed Boh's second defence of diminished responsibility. The prosecution decided to not seek the death penalty (the maximum penalty for murder) and instead argued for Boh to be sentenced for life behind bars.

The next day, on 8 February 2020, Justice Pang sentenced 51-year-old Boh Soon Ho to life imprisonment. Justice Pang noted that based on the sentencing principles inherited from the Kho Jabing case, and according to the prosecution's submissions, Boh did not exhibit a blatant disregard for human life or viciousness when he strangled Zhang to death, and he did not premeditate the murder despite having ample motive by jealousy to commit the killing. Other factors such as Boh's low IQ and remorse over the crime were also duly considered by the judge during sentencing.

Although his life sentence was taken to mean spending the rest of his natural life in jail, Boh will be entitled to a possible chance of release on parole after spending at least 20 years in jail provided that he displays good conduct while in prison. No caning was imposed on Boh since he was 51 years old at the time of sentencing.

On the same day of Boh's sentencing, Thuraisingam, who agreed with the prosecution's submissions for a life term in Boh's case, confirmed that his client would appeal against his murder conviction. Boh's two other charges of dishonest misappropriation of Zhang's possessions and sexual penetration of a corpse were also withdrawn by the prosecution at the end of Boh's murder trial.

== Appeal and imprisonment ==
On 28 October 2020, more than eight months after the end of his trial, 52-year-old Boh Soon Ho's appeal was dismissed by the Court of Appeal. The three judges hearing the appeal – Judges of Appeal Tay Yong Kwang and Judith Prakash and High Court judge Woo Bih Li – unanimously found that Boh was not suffering from sudden and grave provocation when he murdered Zhang Huaxiang. They additionally rejected the original trial judge's finding that Boh was indeed provoked, albeit not gravely or lost his self-control in killing Zhang Huaxiang.

Justice Tay, who delivered the judgement, read that they felt Boh was more frustrated and agitated that he never got to have sex with the victim. He also cited a psychiatric report which the judges referred to, in the aftermath of the murder, some aspects of Boh's conduct at that time, such as fleeing Singapore and went into hiding in his hometown in Melaka, reflected a state of mind that was "unfettered by any loss of self-control or impulse control".

Despite upholding Boh's conviction for murder, they did not change Boh's life sentence to the death penalty and hence Boh is currently serving his life sentence at Changi Prison.

== See also ==
- List of cases affected by the Kho Jabing case
