= Kan Ting Chiu =

Singaporean judge

- 简廷照

Senior Judge of the Supreme Court of Singapore
- In office 5 January 2015 – 4 January 2018
- Appointed by: Tony Tan

Judge of the Supreme Court of Singapore
- In office 2 May 1994 – 27 August 2011
- Appointed by: Ong Teng Cheong

Judicial Commissioner of Singapore
- In office 2 May 1991 – 2 May 1994
- Appointed by: Wee Kim Wee

Personal details
- Born: 27 August 1946 (age 80) Singapore

Kan Ting Chiu (simplified Chinese: 简廷照; traditional Chinese: 簡廷照; pinyin: Jiǎn Tíng Zhào) is a former Judge in the Supreme Court. Kan retired as a Judge on 27 August 2011 at the age of 65.

Kan received his Bachelor of Laws and Master of Laws from the University of Singapore (now the National University of Singapore) in 1970 and 1988 respectively. He was admitted as an advocate and solicitor in Singapore in 1973. He joined the Singapore Legal Service in 1970 and was appointed State Counsel at the Attorney-General's Chambers. From 1974 to 1976, he served both as a Magistrate and a Senior Magistrate in the Subordinate Courts. Kan went into private practice from 1976 to 1991, where he was successively a partner in the law firms of Hilborne & Co, RCH Lim & Co and Low Yeap & Co. He was appointed as Judicial Commissioner on 2 May 1991, and a Judge of the Supreme Court on 2 May 1994.

Kan was a Council Member of the Law Society of Singapore from 1983 to 1984. From 1993 to 2005, he was a member of the Board of Legal Education, a body which provided for the training and examination of law graduates seeking admission to the Singapore Bar. Since 1999, Kan has also served as Chairman of the Singapore Academy of Law's Legal Heritage Committee.

Kan was the judge in the trials of Van Tuong Nguyen and Iwuchukwu Amara Tochi, both for drug-trafficking, which resulted in both of their executions by hanging.

== List of other cases presided by Kan Ting Chiu ==
=== Murder of Nonoi ===
On 1 March 2006, a Malay girl named Nurasyura binte Mohamed Fauzi, better known by her nickname Nonoi, went missing and there was a highly publicised search for the missing girl. However, in a twist of horror, the stepfather of the missing girl confessed to his wife and mother-in-law that he accidentally killed Nonoi when he dipped her into water while trying to stop her crying. The stepfather, 29-year-old Mohammed Ali bin Johari, was placed under arrest and charged with murder. Autopsy findings found that the girl, whose body was found under a flyover at Pan Island Expressway, had a lot of water in her lungs and some signs of sexual injuries at her vaginal area, indicating that Mohammed Ali had raped the 2-year-old victim.

Justice Kan Ting Chiu, who heard the case, found that Mohammed Ali, who repeatedly denied raping Nonoi and insisted that Nonoi died an accidental death, had intentionally immersed his stepdaughter in water and these immersions led to the victim's death, and hence he was guilty of the crime of murder. Justice Kan sentenced Mohammed Ali to death on 31 August 2007. Mohammed Ali was executed on 19 December 2008.

=== The case of Kho Jabing ===
On 17 February 2008, Kho Jabing, a 24-year-old Malaysian from Sarawak, went to commit robbery with his 23-year-old accomplice Galing Anak Kujat when they targeted two Chinese construction workers Cao Ruyin and Wu Jun. Cao Ruyin was assaulted by Kho, who used a tree branch to repeatedly bash at Cao on the head while Galing went after Wu, who managed to escape with minor injuries. Cao Ruyin, who suffered skull fractures and brain injuries as a result of the attack, later died in a coma six days after the crime. Kho and Galing were later captured and placed into police custody to face trial for murder.

Justice Kan Ting Chiu, who heard the case in July 2009 and delivered his judgement in July 2010, determined that both Kho and Galing shared a common intention to commit robbery. He also determined that Kho's actions of causing the injuries on the deceased victim was in the furtherance of the common intention of the pair to rob the victim and his friend, and that the injuries he intentionally caused were in the ordinary cause of nature to cause death, which constitutes an offence of murder committed under section 300(c) of the Penal Code. He also reject Kho's claim of alcohol intoxication as he cited that Kho was able to clearly recount the events that took place, showing full control of his faculties at the time.

Justice Kan stated that Galing's participation in the robbery was an indication of him knowing that his accomplice's actions were likely to cause death and thus he also has to bear that same responsibility as Kho and thus he also convict Galing of murder in lieu of both their common intention. As murder carries a mandatory sentence of death, both Kho and Galing were sentenced to death. Both men appealed, but in May 2011, it would end with only Kho losing his appeal and his death sentence upheld by the higher courts while Galing, on the other hand, successfully had his conviction lowered to one of robbery with hurt and had his case remitted back to Justice Kan for re-sentencing. Justice Kan, who got back Galing's case from the Court of Appeal, then promptly re-sentenced Galing to 18 years and six months' imprisonment and 19 strokes of the cane. After that, on 27 August 2011, he retired from the Bench.

Meanwhile, after Justice Kan's retirement, there were changes to the law in 2013 which removed the mandatory death penalty for certain capital offences. The judges in Singapore were given an option to impose life imprisonment with or without caning for offenders who commit murder but had no intention to kill. As Kho Jabing was found guilty of such a crime, he was given a chance like all death row inmates to have his sentence reviewed for re-sentencing, and although it was ordered that Kho's case was to be remitted to the original trial judge for re-sentencing, but due to Justice Kan's retirement at that point of time, High Court judge Tay Yong Kwang took over the case instead. Kho was subsequently re-sentenced to life imprisonment with 24 strokes of the cane.

However, in January 2015, Kho would later on be sentenced to death a second time when the prosecution appealed to the Court of Appeal, who found that Kho had demonstrated both a blatant disregard for human life and viciousness while killing Cao Ruyin, and Kho's actions were such that it outraged the feelings of the community, which made the Court of Appeal, by a majority decision of 3 to 2, sentenced Kho to death while overturning his life sentence. Eventually, Kho was hanged to death at Changi Prison on 20 May 2016; he was 32 years old when he died.
