= Audrey Lim =

High Court Judge of the Singapore Supreme Court

Justice Audrey Lim Yoon Cheng is a High Court Judge of the Singapore Supreme Court. She was appointed as Judicial Commissioner of the Supreme Court in 2016 and as a High Court Judge in 2019. She graduated from the University of Cambridge in 1993.

Lim was the trial judge who sentenced Leslie Khoo Kwee Hock to life imprisonment after convicting of murder for the death of his girlfriend Cui Yajie at Gardens by the Bay. She agreed with the prosecutor Hri Kumar Nair's arguments for life imprisonment as Khoo did not exhibit any blatant disregard for human life or viciousness from the manner of killing, for which his case would not warrant the death penalty (the maximum punishment for murder) in comparison to precedent legal cases.
