= 2016 in Singapore =

- Decades: 1990s; 2000s; 2010s; 2020s
- See also: Other events of 2016; Timeline of Singaporean history

The following lists events that happened during 2016 in the Republic of Singapore.

== Incumbents ==
- President: Tony Tan Keng Yam
- Prime Minister: Lee Hsien Loong

== Events ==
=== January ===
- 7 January – Netflix is launched in Singapore.
- 11 January – Viu is launched in Singapore, providing Asian dramas.
- 15 January – The 13th Parliament of Singapore (which consist of a 92-member parliament formed after the general election last September) opens its inaugural session.
- 18 January – Waterway Point opens in Punggol.
- 21 January – Several plans were announced for transport, including dedicating express bus lanes for the North–South Expressway with cycling and walking paths aboveground, and a cycling lane for Bencoolen Street by 2017 with walking paths. More cycling paths will be built in estates like Bidadari, Tampines and Ang Mo Kio, along with better public transport. Eventually, a new target for 85 percent of commuters travelling by public transport by 2050s was set.

=== February ===
- 4 February - The Woodlands Regional Bus Interchange will be upgraded, with all operations moved to a temporary interchange on 12 March.
- 5 February – The Singapore General Hospital campus will undergo a makeover that will stretch for 20 years.
- 25 February – The Electronic Road Pricing system will be revamped into ERP 2.0 from 2020 onwards.
- 29 February – Sam Kee LRT station is opened.

=== March ===
- 3 March –
  - Singapore Airlines took delivery of an A350, which arrived in Singapore.
  - The Marina Bay District Cooling Network is fully commissioned, making it the world's biggest. The success of this project led the Ministry of National Development to consider it for Jurong Lake District.
- 10 March – Design 2025 is launched with 15 recommendations to make Singapore a global city of design, all accepted by the Ministry of Communications and Information.
- 11 March – After a voting exercise beginning on 8 January, Lush Green is selected as the new bus livery colour over Bright Red. At the same time, two concept buses with three doors, two staircases and USB charging ports are released.
- 16 March – Farrer Park Hospital is officially opened.
- 22 March – A MRT train accident occurs at Pasir Ris MRT station, causing two fatalities.
- 24 March – Minister for Finance Heng Swee Keat delivers his inaugural budget statement in Parliament, entitled Budget 2016. The new Jurong Innovation District will be built too with the first phase by 2022, as well as a new Industry Transformation Programme unveiled, with Industry Transformation Maps to guide industries' transformation efforts.
- 27 March – Shaw Theatres closes its Bugis Junction branch.

=== April ===
- 8 April – The Ministry of Education announced a new expanded Early Admission Exercise for admission to polytechnics, as well as an expanded Discretionary Admission Scheme for admission to universities. Also in, all Secondary 3 students will have a chance to experience five-day OBS camps from 2020, made possible with a new OBS campus in Coney Island.
- 11 April – The Ministry of Communications and Information announced that Wireless@SG speeds will increase from 2Mpbs to 5Mpbs by end-2016, as well as the doubling of hotspots to 20,000 by 2018.
- 12 April – Kidzania Singapore opens its doors in Sentosa, but hence reopening in 2024 after four years of its closure since 2020.
- 13 April – The Ministry of Health announced a war on diabetes. A new taskforce is formed to tackle the issue with three strategies.
- 19 April –
  - Waterway Point, a waterfront mall in Punggol, officially opens.
  - Apple Pay is launched in Singapore. Since then, Samsung Pay and Android Pay are launched too.
- 24 April - Punggol Safra Clubhouse opened its doors to the public and National Servicemen.
- 28 April – The Land Transport Authority announced a new North–South Corridor, which is a 21.5 km expressway which goes from the northern region to the city. It will be integrated with several bus and bicycle lanes, with completion by 2026.
- 29 April – Phase 1 of the future Tuas Terminal starts construction, with the first caisson launched.

=== May ===
- 6 May – Circles.Life is launched as a mobile virtual network operator (MVNO).
- 7 May – Murali Pillai, a former candidate who previously contested the opposition-held Aljunied GRC in last year's general election, is elected as MP for the Bukit Batok By-Election, succeeding David Ong, who resigned on 12 March citing an extra-marital affair. Pillai is sworn into Parliament two days later.
- 12 May – Minister for Finance Heng Swee Keat suffers a stroke during a Cabinet meeting, and is rushed to Tan Tock Seng Hospital to undergo neurosurgery treatment; in Heng's place until 22 August, his Ministerial Portfolio was relieved by Deputy Prime Minister (and former Finance Minister) Tharman Shanmugaratnam, while MPs of Tampines GRC and Tampines Central predecessor, Sin Boon Ann oversee Heng's ward.
- 13 May – As part of the 2015–16 Zika virus epidemic, the first case of Zika virus infection in Singapore is announced; a Singaporean man who had travelled to Brazil. He made a full recovery by 17 May.
- 20 May – Sarawakian convicted murderer Jabing Kho is executed in Changi Prison at 3:30 pm after the latest appeal is dismissed by the Supreme Court.
- 29 May – Services 77, 106, 173, 177, 189, 941, 945, 947 & 990 handed over to Tower Transit Singapore.

=== June ===
- 1 June –
  - The smoking ban is extended to parks and reservoirs, as well as SAF and MHA camps.
  - Plans are unveiled for the revamp of Mandai. Two new parks will be located, namely the Bird Park and Rainforest Park, as well as eco-accommodation. The project will be ready by 2020.
- 2 June – The National Council of Social Service launches a five-year campaign called "See The True Me" to encourage inclusion for persons with disabilities.
- 7 June – The Ministry of Home Affairs (MHA) announced that foreign sponsors will not be allowed to sponsor any event at Speakers' Corner (including Pink Dot) in a bid to counter foreign interference. MHA clarified a day later that no action will be taken against foreign sponsors of Pink Dot that year.
- 12 June – Services 66, 78, 79, 97, 97e & 143/143M handed over to Tower Transit Singapore.
- 16 June – After a spate of lift accidents resulting in one fatality, the Building and Construction Authority announced the tightening of lift maintenance, requiring lifts to display permits to operate, and mandatory reporting of incidents involving lifts. More details are given for this, taking effect on 25 July. Similar requirements for escalators are announced on 8 July, taking effect on 1 November.
- 19 June – Loyang Bus Depot is officially opened during a carnival.
- 25 June – Minister for Finance Heng Swee Keat is discharged from Tan Tock Seng Hospital after six weeks of stroke treatment, and announced that Heng was currently taking medical leave to focus on his rehabilitation. It is also revealed that Heng will not be attending the 2016's National Day Parade (to be held on 9 August), citing that he would avoid further infection after revealing that he also suffered a lung infection during his intensive care.
- 26 June –
  - Services 41, 49, 96, 98/98M, 183, 282, 284, 285, 333, 334 & 335 handed over to Tower Transit Singapore.
  - Underwater World, Singapore ceases operations.
- 27 June – Singapore Airlines Flight 368's right wing engine #2 catches fire after takeoff from Singapore Changi Airport and makes emergency landing on the same airport it took off from. No injuries are reported.
- 30 June –
  - Funan DigitaLife Mall ceases operation and begins demolition.
  - MINDEF announced that pre-enlistees entering National Service from 2017 can choose vocations (which is later revealed as 33 vocations), subject to operational needs.

=== July ===
- 5 July – FactWire reports that several C151A trains are being secretly recalled.
- 7 July – A robbery occurs at a Standard Chartered branch in Holland Village.
- 12 July – The Army Deployment Force was officially inaugurated in Nee Soon Camp.
- 13 July – The Ministry of Education announced that the Primary School Leaving Examination (PSLE) T-scores will be revamped into 8 Achievement Levels in a bid to reduce stress, taking effect from 2021. In addition, choice order will be a new tie-breaker for secondary school posting.
- 19 July – Singapore and Malaysia sign a Memorandum of Understanding (MoU) for the Kuala Lumpur-Singapore High Speed Rail (HSR) project. The 350 km line is targeted for completion by 2026, with the journey between Singapore and Kuala Lumpur taking 90 minutes. In addition, there will be three services with trains travelling up to 300 km/h.
- 21 July – The first Singapore edition of the Michelin Guide is released.
- 26 July – A controversy erupts after stories of inappropriate games emerged during National University of Singapore (NUS) camps.
- 30 July – The first National Reading Day is launched to get Singaporeans to read.

=== August ===
- 1 August –
  - The Transport Safety Investigation Bureau is formed from a merger of the Air Accident Investigation Bureau and Marine Safety Investigation Branch of the Maritime and Port Authority of Singapore.
  - The second phase of the ban covering all emerging tobacco products and shisha comes into effect.
- 5–21 August – 25 athletes from Singapore compete at the 2016 Summer Olympics in Rio de Janeiro, Brazil. The team produced a single medal: (on 12 August Brazil time/13 August Singapore time) swimmer Joseph Schooling beat American Michael Phelps (then the most decorated Olympian of all time) in the 100 m butterfly to win Singapore's first ever Olympic gold medal and set an Olympic record.
- 5 August – Indonesian police foils a rocket plot on Marina Bay.
- 6 August – Pokémon Go, a record-setting augmented reality game, is officially released in Singapore.
- 9 August - The National Day Parade (NDP) 2016 returns to the brand new indoor National Stadium at the Singapore Sports Hub after a 10-year hiatus of the parade being held at the former National Stadium since 2006.
- 15 August – The Administration of Justice (Protection) Act is passed to deal with cases of contempt of court more effectively.
- 21 August – A health scare occurs during the National Day Rally speech, which is resolved an hour later.
- 22 August – Former President, S.R. Nathan (the nation's sixth and longest-serving at the time) dies at the age of 92, after suffering a stroke three weeks prior. On 25 August, over 20,000 paid their respects when he was lying in state at Parliament House, Singapore. On 26 August, Nathan was accorded a state funeral and cremated at Mandai Crematorium.
- 25 August – NuTonomy launches the world's first driverless taxi trials in one-north.
- 26 August – During the 2016 Southeast Asian haze caused by Indonesia, Singapore's 24-hour Pollutant Standards Index (PSI) entered the 'unhealthy' range of above 100, while its 3-hour PSI reached 215.
- 27–31 August – Over five days, the first 115 cases of locally transmitted Zika virus infection in Singapore are confirmed; 110 from the combined area of Aljunied Crescent, Kallang Way, Paya Lebar Way and Sims Drive. The remaining live at various areas: Bedok North Avenue 3, Joo Seng Road, and Punggol Way.

=== September ===
- 4 September – Services 3, 34, 43/43M, 62, 82, 83, 84, 85, 118, 119, 136, 382 & 386 handed over to Go-Ahead Singapore.
- 7–18 September – 13 athletes from Singapore compete in six sports (archery, athletics, boccia, equestrian, swimming, and sailing) at the 2016 Summer Paralympics in Rio de Janeiro, Brazil. On 10 September, swimmer Yip Pin Xiu won a gold medal in the 100m backstroke, S2 finals with a world record of 2:07.09, with an additional world record for the 59.38 split for the first 50m of the race. Yip won another gold medal on 16 September in the 50m backstroke, S2 finals with a time of 1:00.33, becoming the first Singaporean to win multiple gold medals at the Paralympics. On 12 September, swimmer Theresa Goh won a bronze medal in the SB4 100m breaststroke final, with a time of 1:55.55. While qualifying for the finals, she set a new Asian record in the heats at 1:54.50.
- 7 September – Construction begins on Funan, a mixed-use development comprising offices, serviced residences and retail spaces, replacing Funan DigitaLife Mall. The mall will also feature sports, urban farming and collection of products ordered online.
- 8 September – Plans for a new HDB town in Tengah are launched. It will be a town in a forest with a car-free town centre. The first flats are launched in 2018.
- 14 September – Total local Zika cases have reached 333; with infected patients from previously affected areas, as well as Simei's Harvey Crescent, Upper Thomson's Tagore Avenue, Yishun Street 81, Bishan Street 12, Elite Terrace and Ubi Crescent. A new cluster of Jalan Raya and Circuit Road formed, while Bedok North Avenue 3 formed a cluster with Bedok North Avenue 2 and Bedok North Street 3, and also the Aljunied Crescent cluster expanded to Circuit Road, Geylang East Central and Geylang East Avenue 1.
- 15 September – CorpPass is officially launched for businesses to access secured Government transactions, which will be a requirement in 2018.
- 16 September - The Building and Construction Authority announced eight recommendations to improve lift safety after several incidents involving lifts. Three days later, the Housing and Development Board announced a new Lift Enhancement Programme to help town councils modernise lifts in HDB flats, funding 90 percent of total costs. The programme will cost S$450 million with 20,000 lifts eligible for the features.
- 18 September – Services 2, 6, 12, 15, 17/17A, 36, 354, 358, 359, 403 & 518/518A handed over to Go-Ahead Singapore.
- 19–23 September – City Harvest Church Criminal Breach of Trust Case: A five-day appeal lodged by the six convicted City Harvest Church pastors over an alleged S$50 million fund misuse, who at the time were serving their jail sentences, is held, concluding on 7 April 2017 with their jail sentences shortened.
- 24 September – SGSecure is launched to prepare for emergencies.
- 27 September – The fifth desalination plant will be built on Jurong Island, to be completed by 2020.
- 30 September –
  - Radio station XFM 96.3 ceases transmission.
  - Yang Yin is jailed 6 years for misappropriation in a saga that made the headlines. A subsequent appeal by the prosecution resulted in a 9-year jail term in 2017.

=== October ===
- 1 October – The Infocomm Media Development Authority and GovTech are formed to take on a changing media landscape, resulting in the dissolution of the Media Development Authority and Infocomm Development Authority of Singapore.
- 4 October –
  - Workforce Singapore is formed from a merger between Singapore Workforce Development Agency (WDA) and Committee for Private Education (CPE). However, SkillsFuture Singapore is formed as a statutory board under the Ministry of Education. The two statutory boards will help cater for a changing economy.
  - The Singapore Underwater World senior diver, Philip Chan was killed after he was stung in the chest by a stingray.
- 7 October – Singaporean singer Nathan Hartono finishes second in the inaugural season of Sing! China, after a controversial final episode that saw 92 votes cast among 81 judges due to a technical glitch.
- 12 October - The Ministry of Education announced that SIM University (UniSIM) will become Singapore's sixth autonomous university. The proposal is eventually approved by UniSIM's board of directors on 11 November.
- 13 October -
  - Acting Singapore Prime Minister Teo Chee Hean sent his condolences over the passing of Thailand King Bhumibol Adulyadej.
  - AETOS is acquired by Surbana Jurong, a Singaporean government-owned consultancy company focusing on infrastructure and urban development. This will help boost AETOS's expertise in security, especially in buildings.
- 17 October - Singapore Press Holdings (SPH) announced that The New Paper will merge with bilingual newspaper My Paper from 1 December, resulting in staff cuts up to 10%.
- 19 October –
  - The first driverless bus trial could start from as early as 2018 in Jurong West. This is announced after an agreement is signed between the Land Transport Authority and Nanyang Technological University.
  - The Ministry of Trade and Industry announced that all industrial land and properties, as well as industrial functions under the Housing and Development Board will be transferred to JTC Corporation by the first quarter of 2018. This will help support SMEs better as they only need to approach one agency, as well as allow effective planning of industry estates in future.
- 21–26 October – The Singapore national culinary team won the Culinary Olympics for the first time with one gold for the Cold Display category and one gold for the Hot Cooking category. The team consisted of six male chefs: Louis Tay, Teo Yeow Siang, Alan Wong, Triston Fang, Roy Lim and Alex Chong.
- 21 October –
  - The Ministry of Home Affairs announced that Singapore entities will be exempted from applying permits for sponsoring events at Speakers' Corner, while non-Singapore entities must apply for permits before sponsoring such events. These changes have taken effect on 1 November. Rules for indoor assemblies will reflect these changes too.
  - Big Splash closed its doors.
- 27 October - The Public Transport Council allows a fare reduction of 4.2% thanks to lower energy costs. At the same time, all fares will be calculated based on distance travelled instead of the fastest route, with transport fares for underground MRT lines reduced to match fares for above-ground options. These changes started on 30 December.

=== November ===
- 1 November – Singaporean cars to pay new RM20 (S$6.60) Vehicle Entry Permit (VEP) charge to enter mainland Johor, Malaysia.
- 2 November – Lazada has acquired RedMart, a local online grocer store.
- 3 November – Super Group, a local coffee company, will be acquired by Jacobs Douwe Egberts, a Dutch coffee firm. The acquisition is completed in 2017.
- 4 November –
  - The Ministry of Education announced that the Compulsory Education Act will be extended to special needs children from 2019, encouraging a more inclusive environment.
  - Tigerair will be merged with Scoot, which is completed on 25 July 2017.
- 8 November – Prime Minister Lee Hsien Loong announced that the 2017 presidential election will be reserved for the Malay community, resulting in President Tony Tan announcing he will not stand in that election.
- 9 November – Changes to the Elected Presidency are passed in Parliament. Among them are a threshold of S$500 million, increasing the Council of Presidential Advisors (CPA) to eight members and reserving the election for races if no member from a particular race is elected for the past five terms.
- 10 November – Laws are passed to allow iris scanning at checkpoints as an alternative to fingerprint scanning, as well as the collection of iris images. In addition, people from private entities can be appointed registration officers, and inappropriate names can be refused registration. Immigration and Checkpoints Authority officers will be able to investigate offences like suspicious identity cards.
- 11 November – It is concluded that recent signal interferences on the Circle MRT line are caused by rouge train PV46.
- 14 November - The Immigration and Checkpoints Authority announced that re-registration of NRICs will be required for those aged 55 and above from 1 January 2017.
- 15 November – All new prepaid SIM cards issued will no longer support 2G phones as part of the shutdown the following year.
- 16 November – Reclamation works on a new section of Pulau Tekong have officially started. Done by the Housing and Development Board, the project uses the polder method, helping to reduce the amount of sand required for reclamation. This makes it the first project in Singapore to be reclaimed in this manner, which will be finished by 2022.
- 21 November – A new anti-scam helpline becomes operational to tackle the rise in scams, after being launched a day earlier.
- 22 November – SGInnovate is launched to help tech startups.
- 23 November – Mediacorp announced that Manja will go digital from 2017, with its last issue in December.
- 24 November –
  - Hooq is launched in Singapore.
  - Nine Terrexes are seized in Hong Kong, being released in January 2017.
  - Punggol Safra Clubhouse is officially opened.
- 25 November – The first Belrex PCSV is launched in Singapore.
- 29 November
  - The Republic of Singapore Air Force launched an aerostat, first mooted in 2014. The aerostat has an operating height of 600 metres with radar coverage up to 200 kilometers.
  - PIXEL Studios is officially opened in one-north as a dedicated facility for digital content creators and media professionals, managed by Infocomm Media Development Authority.

=== December ===
- 1 December –
  - Lee Sze Yong was convicted of kidnapping Ng Lye Poh (mother of Sheng Siong's CEO Lim Hock Chee) on 9 January 2014. Lee was given life imprisonment and three strokes of cane instead of death penalty, in a letter approved by Justice Chan Seng Onn. Lee later appealed for a lighter sentence in March 2017 but to no success.
  - The New Paper is relaunched as a free newspaper.
- 3 December – Zouk (club) closed its Jiak Kim Street location, moving to Clarke Quay on 17 December.
- 4 December - The PAssion Silver Concession Card is launched for Singaporeans aged 60 and above, merging the existing senior citizen concession card and PAssion card into one.
- 13 December – Singapore and Malaysia sign an agreement for the Kuala Lumpur-Singapore High Speed Rail (HSR) project, targeted to start operations by 31 December 2026. The HSR will link both countries by a 25-metre high bridge over the Straits of Johor. Separately, the Johor Bahru–Singapore Rapid Transit System will be linked via a high bridge across the Straits of Johor, as well as adopt systems used on the Thomson–East Coast MRT line. There will be triennial cultural showcases for artists from both countries to showcase their work.
- 14 December – TPG Telecom wins the auction to become Singapore's fourth telco, beating 2 other contenders including MyRepublic.
- 18 December - The Tampines Concourse Bus Interchange opens with inclusive facilities for all.
- 27 December - Two new platforms along Choa Chu Kang LRT station open.
- 29 December – Punggol Point LRT station is opened. In addition, 2-car trains have started operating on the Punggol LRT line.

Unknown date - Junction Nine shopping mall in Yishun is opened to shoppers.

Unknown date - Alexandra Central, a shopping mall next to IKEA Alexandra is opened.

== Deaths ==
- 18 January – T. S. Sinnathuray, former High Court judge (b. 1930).
- 21 January – Francis Seow, former Solicitor-General of Singapore and former President of the Law Society of Singapore (b. 1928).
- 2 February – Jopie Ong, Metro boss (b. 1941).
- 14 February – Tan Poh Huat, murder victim in the Choa Chu Kang Combined Temple murder (b. 1963).
- 20 February – Sia Yong, business leader and founder of the Singa-Sino Friendship Association (b. 1926).
- 27 February – Lee Khoon Choy, diplomat and former PAP Member of Parliament for Bukit Panjang Constituency, Hong Lim Constituency and Braddell Heights Constituency (b. 1924).
- 21 March – Zhang Huaxiang, murder victim in the Circuit Road flat murder (b. 1987).
- 23 March – Muhammad Ariff Ahmad, writer, editor and lecturer (b. 1924).
- 12 April – Said Zahari, former editor-in-chief of Utusan Melayu and political activist (b. 1928).
- 10 May – Lee Seng Gee, Chairman of Lee Foundation (b. 1921).
- 7 June – Seow Kim Choo, murder victim of Indonesian maid Daryati (b. 1956–1957).
- 9 July – Goh Eng Thiam, murder victim in the Geylang stabbing death (b. 1963–1964).
- 21 July – Chor Yeok Eng, former PAP Member of Parliament for Jurong Constituency and Bukit Timah Constituency (b. 1930).
- 26 July – Piang Ngaih Don, maid murdered by Prema S. Naraynasamy and Gaiyathiri Murugayan (b. 1992).
- 9 August – Han Tan Juan, journalist (b. 1942).
- 21 August – Chua Kim Yeow, first local accountant-general and candidate in the 1993 presidential election (b. 1926).
- 22 August – S. R. Nathan, 6th President of Singapore (b. 1924).
- 1 September – Phan Wait Hong, Beijing opera pioneer (b. 1914).
- 23 October – Unnamed five-year-old boy, murder victim in the Toa Payoh child abuse case (b. 2011).
- 30 October – Lee Boon Wang, painter (b. 1934).
- 25 November – Maimunah binte Awang, murder victim in the Tanah Merah Ferry Terminal murder (b. 1961–1962).
