= 2016 Geylang stabbing death =

2016 death of a man at Geylang, Singapore

- Toh Sia Guan's bloodstained knife, which he used to attack and kill Goh.
- Date: 9 July 2016
- Location: Geylang, Singapore
- Outcome: Toh Sia Guan being found guilty of murder for attacking Goh Eng Thiam; Toh Sia Guan losing his appeal against his conviction and sentence; Toh Sia Guan serving one term of life imprisonment at Changi Prison
- Deaths: Goh Eng Thiam
- Injuries: None
- Convicted: Toh Sia Guan
- Verdict: Guilty
- Convictions: Murder under Section 300(c) of the Penal Code (one count)
- Sentence: Life imprisonment

On 9 July 2016, Goh Eng Thiam, (Note: Chinese: 吴英添; pinyin: Wú Yīngtiān) a 52-year-old coffee shop worker, was attacked and stabbed six times by Toh Sia Guan, (Note: Chinese: 卓谢源; pinyin: Zhuó Xièyuán) a 64-year-old scrap dealer, in front of several witnesses outside a coffee shop along Lorong 23 Geylang, Singapore. Goh, who sustained several knife wounds, died following massive bleeding from a stab wound to his right arm which cut through a major blood artery. Prior to the stabbing, the two had gotten into a fight after Toh allegedly provoked Goh by asking if he was selling medicine; this caused Goh to fight Toh, who subsequently purchased a knife to seek revenge.

Toh was recognised by the witnesses and others as a homeless karang guni (Note: Scrap dealer in Singapore and Malaysia.) nicknamed "Hong Qigong" who often collected cardboard throughout Geylang to re-sell it for money. The police arrested Toh after twelve days of tracing him. On 2 March 2020, four years after the crime, Toh was charged and found guilty of murder and was sentenced to life imprisonment.

== Fatal fight at Geylang ==
Goh Eng Thiam, who was gravely injured in the attack, died from excessive arterial blood loss from a cut to his arm.

On the morning of 9 July 2016, outside a kopitiam at Geylang and in front of several witnesses, a 52-year-old male customer of the shop was attacked by an elderly man, who used a knife to slash and stab him several times, including on the chest and arms. Both men later exchanged blows while lying on the ground before a taxi driver shouted at the pair, causing the elderly man to quickly flee the scene of crime; his knife was abandoned near the scene of crime. The injured victim, Goh Eng Thiam, who subsequently lay down on the curb at the roadside due to exhaustion after the fight, eventually lost consciousness and upon the arrival of the ambulance, Goh was pronounced dead at 8.11 am. The forensic pathologist, Dr Paul Chui, later performed an autopsy on Goh and determined that the cause of Goh's death was a single knife wound to the right upper arm, which cut through a major blood artery and resulted in Goh's death due to massive bleeding from the wound.

At the time of his death, Goh left behind a 56-year-old ex-wife, three children: a 19-year-old son and two daughters aged 26 and 30, and one son-in-law. Goh's children, in an interview, expressed their sadness over their father's death and remembered Goh as a soft-hearted, loving father despite his hot temper. Despite having divorced his wife more than ten years ago, Goh maintained close contact with his children and ex-wife, and would visit his children often. It was said that Goh wanted to earn more money in order to properly reunite with his family prior to his untimely death. Goh's younger daughter appealed to the public and police for help to arrest the killer who attacked her father. Goh was also revealed to be the assistant of the zi char hawker stall at the coffee shop where he met his end from the stabbing incident, and he still worked there daily despite having retired to waive off his extra time. Goh's acquaintances who knew him described Goh as someone who often helped people in trouble and would show loyalty to those he knew. Undertaker Roland Tay, who was known for organizing pro bono funerals for high-profile murder victims like Huang Na and Liu Hong Mei, helped Goh's children to recover Goh's body, as well as arrange funeral preparations and Buddhist rituals on their behalf.

== Investigation and arrest ==
The police classified Goh's death as murder and a team led by Assistant Superintendent of Police (ASP) Thinagaran Krishnasamy from CID took charge of the investigations. They interviewed the customers and stallholders of the coffee shop, who all recognised the elderly attacker by his nickname "Hong Qigong" (洪七公 Hóng Qìgōng), a name which meant "chief of beggars" in Chinese. The old man "Hong Qigong" was a neighbourhood character and karang guni man who often roamed the streets of Geylang to collect trash, mainly cardboard and cans, to re-sell for money. He was also known to often sleep in the streets, either under the MRT tracks or park areas.

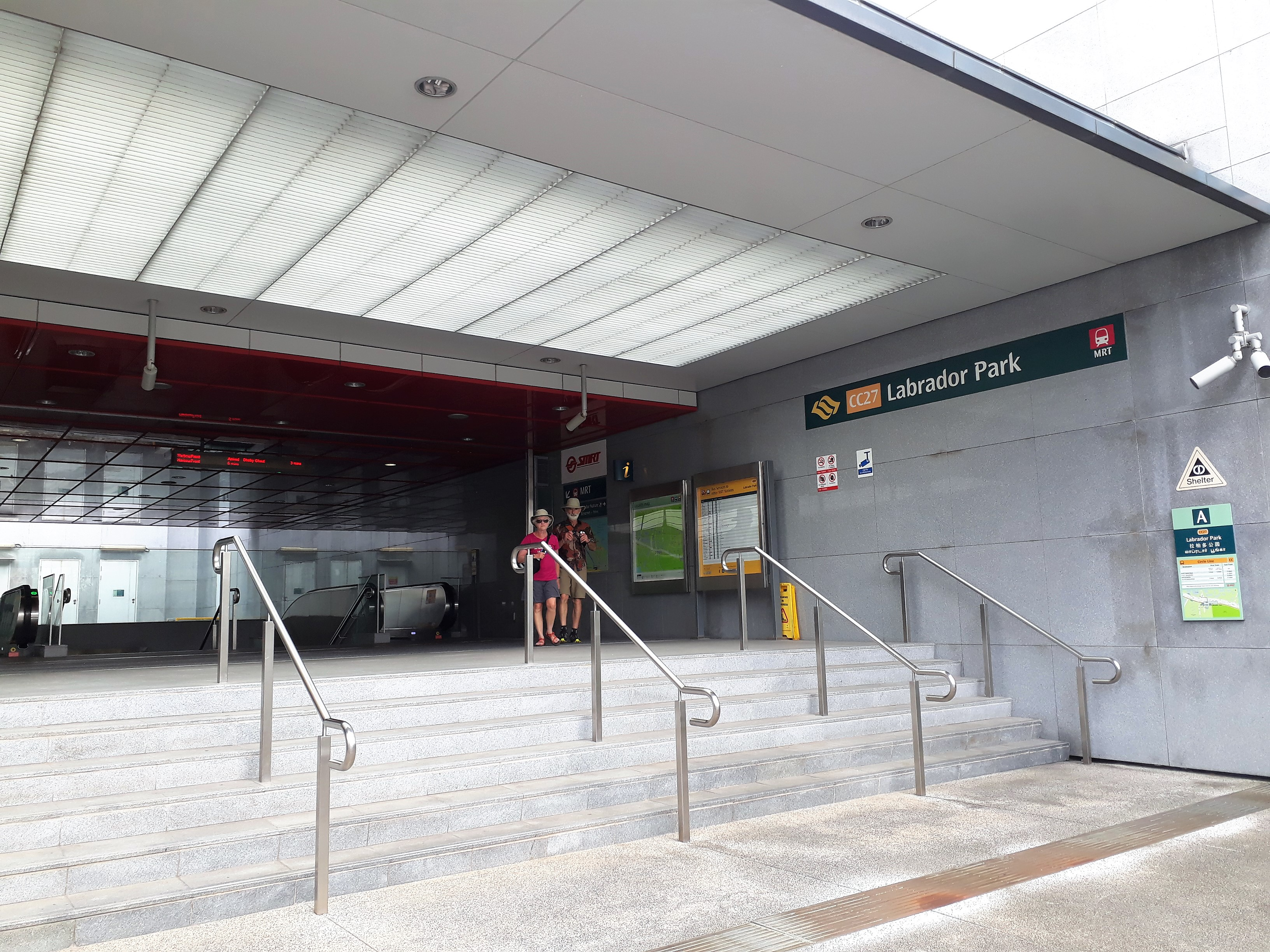
Labrador Park MRT station, where Toh Sia Guan was sighted and arrested by the police for Goh Eng Thiam's murder.

The CID police investigators, with help from officers of the Geylang neighbourhood police station, spent the next twelve days to trace the identity and whereabouts of the man, whom they eventually identified as Toh Sia Guan, a 64-year-old Singaporean. Toh was eventually sighted at the Labrador Park MRT station and he was subsequently arrested on 21 July 2016, nearly two weeks after he allegedly killed Goh. Toh was charged with murder two days after his arrest, and at the courtroom where Toh was charged, Goh's bereaved family were all present to have a glimpse of his attacker. Goh's elder daughter told reporters outside the court that they had never seen Toh before. After he was charged, Toh was brought back to the crime scene to assist the police with investigations.

The case of Toh was not the first case of homicide to happen in July 2016. There were four other high-profile killings that occurred within that month, and except for one case, all suspects in the remaining three cases were arrested and charged with murder. In light of the killings, the police expressed that every person arrested would face the full brunt of the law and the police would spare no effort to bring these offenders to justice.

== Trial of Toh Sia Guan ==
=== Toh's account and conviction ===
The trial of Toh Sia Guan took place at the High Court on 6 August 2019, with High Court judge Aedit Abdullah being assigned to hear the case. Deputy Public Prosecutors Eugene Lee, Claire Poh and Senthilkumaran Sabapathy were in charge of prosecuting Toh for murder while two lawyers Wong Seow Pin and Wong Li-yen Dew were assigned to represent Toh in his trial.

Toh recounted that on that morning of 9 July 2016 itself, when he cycled to the coffee shop to buy breakfast, he chanced upon Goh Eng Thiam, and he thought that Goh was staring at him. He approached Goh and asked if he sold Chinese medicine. Goh became provoked and he spewed Hokkien expletives as he retorted at Toh, "Do I look like a drug peddler?" This prompted Goh to aggressively pick a fight with the elderly Toh and he even used Toh's bicycle to hit the homeless man. Toh got the lower end of the stick during the fight and he fruitlessly tried to use a wooden stick to hit Goh on the head before he fled the scene.

As Toh lost his slippers during the escape, he went to a hardware store to procure new slippers, as well as a 26.5 cm-long knife, as he wanted to use it for "self-defence" once he returned to retrieve his bicycle and also to settle scores with Goh over the earlier dispute. This led to Toh using the knife to attack Goh and resulted in Goh's unfortunate death from the second fight. After murdering Goh, Toh fled the area of Geylang, and he never again showed up there. Instead, during the escape, he stole a shirt hanging from a clothesline in the area, and put it on after disposing of the bloodstained shirt he wore during the stabbing. He also bought a new pair of slippers from an NTUC FairPrice supermarket in Boon Keng Road before he headed to Ang Mo Kio, where he slept in gardens and parks in the area. Toh managed to lay low in Ang Mo Kio and evade the police for 12 days before he was finally arrested for killing Goh.

Toh, having recounted the turn of events prior to him killing Goh Eng Thiam, put up defences that he accidentally caused the fatal injury on Goh by the victim impaling himself during the scuffle and it was not intentional, and that there was a sudden fight between him and Goh that resulted in Goh's death due to Toh exercising his self-defence. However, it was not agreed upon by the prosecution, as they described the fight as a "vicious and violent revenge attack" and stated that Toh was the one who started the fight by being armed and had intentionally caused hurt to Goh, which led to his death by the stabbing.

On 12 February 2020, 67-year-old Toh Sia Guan was found guilty of murder by the High Court. In convicting Toh, Justice Aedit pointed out that based on the circumstantial evidence, he concluded there was an "irresistible inference" that Toh had intentionally inflicted the fatal wound on Goh's right upper arm despite the absence of witnesses who directly seen him stabbing Goh. He also said that Toh was clearly the aggressor of the attack, since he left the crime scene to procure a knife and had started the second fight with Goh to intentionally cause hurt to the 52-year-old coffee shop assistant, and being armed, he had an undue advantage during the scuffle despite his more advanced age and poorer physical condition compared to the younger and stronger Goh. Hence his defences of a sudden fight, self-defence and accidental injury were rejected by the trial court.

As the charge of murder, which Toh was found guilty of, came under Section 300(c) of the Penal Code, which dictates an offence of murder with intention to inflict an injury that could cause death in the ordinary course of nature, Toh was liable to a possible sentence of life imprisonment or the death sentence in accordance to his conviction.

=== Sentence ===
A month after Toh was convicted, with regards to his sentence, the prosecution declined to make submissions, but they informed the trial court that they would not seek the death penalty for Toh. As for the defence, Toh's lawyer Wong Seow Pin argued that Toh should not be sentenced to death and instead, the minimum sentence of life imprisonment should be awarded in Toh's case, as circumstances of the case did not show that it was an extremely vicious killing or that his client exhibited cruelty or extreme disregard for human life during the course of the crime. He also highlighted about Toh's advanced age, low IQ and poor health, as he has gallstones and other ailments. In his own words while submitting on sentence, Wong described the plight of his client, "By the courts convicting him of murder, Toh loses any hope of sleeping in the park, listening to the birds sing and smelling the dew evaporating. Toh has lost his bicycle, his freedom and in prison will lose his life."

Justice Aedit Abdullah, having considered the circumstances of the case and sentencing submissions, stated that from the 2015 landmark case of Kho Jabing, a Malaysian who was hanged for murdering a construction worker, the Court of Appeal had stated in its judgement back then that the death penalty should be warranted for the worst cases of murder where the actions of the offender, despite lacking the intention to kill, outraged the feelings of the community, and exhibited viciousness or a blatant disregard for human life. He accepted that in contrast to Kho's case, Toh did not know that the injury was fatal and did not show any disregard for human life, and he did not do anything to make Goh suffer as much as possible or inflict unnecessary blows on Goh after he collapsed. Given that a number of factors weighed in Toh's favour, and having noted that the prosecution did not argue for a death sentence on Toh, the judge therefore concluded that Toh should not be sentenced to the gallows for Goh's killing.

As such, on 2 March 2020, 67-year-old Toh Sia Guan was sentenced to life imprisonment. He was not caned as he was above 50 years old at the time of sentencing. Toh asked the judge if he was allowed to appeal, and the judge stated he could, and granted him time to discuss with his counsel relating to the matter.

== Appeal and aftermath ==
On 2 February 2021, nearly a year since he was convicted and sentenced, 68-year-old Toh Sia Guan's appeal against his sentence and conviction was dismissed by the Court of Appeal, after a three-judge panel - consisting of Judges of Appeal Tay Yong Kwang, Andrew Phang and Belinda Ang - heard it on the same day it was dismissed.

Toh, who was unrepresented when he made his appeal, argued earlier that he should not be liable to the charge of murder, once again raising his defence that it was an accidental stabbing that resulted in the fatal wound on Goh Eng Thiam's arm, but the three judges were of the opinion that the trial judge Aedit Abdullah was correct to note that it was more probable that the fatal wound resulted from Toh intentionally inflicting it onto Goh's upper right arm during the fight rather than the victim accidentally impaling the knife onto his arm. They also dismissed Toh's allegations of misconduct by his former defence counsel Wong Seow Pin during his trial, as they found that Wong had rendered his fullest ability and effort to provide legal advice and assistance in Toh's defence to the best of his knowledge, and had not misled his ex-client about the possible sentences for a lower charge of culpable homicide not amounting to murder. Hence the Court of Appeal dismissed Toh's appeal against his conviction.

Not only that, Toh also appealed against the sentence of life imprisonment, claiming that it was a manifestly excessive and extremely harsh punishment for his crime. Justice Phang, who delivered the court's appeal verdict, stated that there was no merit behind Toh's opposition of his sentence, as under Section 302(2) of the Penal Code, the permissible sentences for a Section 300(c) murder conviction were either life imprisonment or the death penalty. Since the sentence of life imprisonment was already the minimum punishment the courts could give to Toh for the murder offence he was convicted of, Toh cannot expect to receive a more lenient sentence than life for his crime, hence the Court of Appeal also dismissed Toh's appeal against his sentence as well. Since the loss of his appeal, Toh is currently incarcerated at Changi Prison, where he is serving his life sentence since 21 July 2016, the date of his first remand.

In the aftermath, the Geylang stabbing case was dramatized in Singapore crime show Crimewatch and the re-enactment aired as the ninth episode of the show's annual season in 2021. In the episode, the victim Goh Eng Thiam's name was changed to Lee Tong Choon and several details of the case were adjusted for dramatic purposes and protection of the victim's privacy, but the major details of the crime overall remained faithful to the real-life details of the case and the killer's name was still retained as Toh Sia Guan.

== See also ==
- Kho Jabing
- Leslie Khoo
- Life imprisonment in Singapore
- Capital punishment in Singapore
- List of major crimes in Singapore
- List of cases affected by the Kho Jabing case
