= Heart of God Church =

Heart of God Church (HOGC)
- Country: Singapore
- Denomination: Non-denominational, Charismatic
- Website: heartofgodchurch.org

History
- Founded: 1999
- Founders: Tan Seow How; Cecilia Chan

Clergy
- Pastors: Daniel Goh (Doctrine); Eng Ee Loo (Youth); Mae-Ann Sahai (Children); Martin Wong (Missions)

Heart of God Church Singapore (Chinese: 神之心教会), or HOGC, is a non-denominational church in Singapore. The church, HOGC was founded by husband and wife Tan Seow How and Cecilia Chan, more commonly known as Pastor How and Pastor Lia, in 1999. Today, Heart of God Church is led by a team of 5 senior pastors, Pastor Tan Seow How, Pastor Cecilia Chan, Pastor Lynette Goh, Pastor Charleston Lim and Pastor Garrett Lee.

The Heart of God Church (HOGC) currently holds its services in Paya Lebar in eastern Singapore. The church maintains a young demographic with an average age of 22 across the church. The church provides developmental opportunities especially for its young people, and that has allowed them to gain new skills and experiences that have helped them find full-time professional jobs. The church is also known for its initiatives to build interfaith harmony in multi-religious Singapore.

== History ==
The church started when How and Lia, along with three other people, held the first group meeting in 1996. The church was officially registered as "Heart of God Church" in August 1999. Lia spotted a group of nine teens who were fast outgrowing the children's church and started the first teens connect group. This group then grew to thousands of young people, some are now the next generation of homegrown pastors.

The small auditorium at Henderson Industrial Park eventually could not hold the growing congregation; in 2004, the church moved from Henderson Industrial Park to Dhoby Ghaut. As the church grew, Lia built GenerationS and a deep bench of operations and worship teams, and How looked into conceptual and ministry systems. In August 2007, the church moved to SingPost Centre in Paya Lebar when the premises were no longer able to accommodate its growing congregation.

In January 2016, the church moved into its current location at Imaginarium, 115 Eunos Avenue 3. In April that year, Senior Pastor Tan Seow How spoke about the need to build trust with neighbouring religious organisations, as a bulwark against flashpoints. The church launched community programmes with Khalid Mosque and Geylang United Temple.

In 2018, Heart of God Church ordained three homegrown pastors: Charleston Lim, Lynette Goh, and Garrett Lee.

Two-time Grammy Award-winner Matt Redman held a worship concert for Heart of God Church's 20th-anniversary celebrations in 2019. In 2020, he released a video for his single, “The Same Jesus” which was recorded live at the church.

Stream of Praise, a Chinese Christian music group, held a worship concert at Heart of God Church in 2019. A video of the concert was released the following year.

The church's seasonal online services are put together by an IT team of mainly 17-to 22-year-olds. They have features such as live chat, live voting, and interactive games. In 2020, the church conducted both the main Easter service and the youth Easter service through its website, followed by online activities, videos, and podcasts to help engage young congregants and encourage them to stay home during the COVID-19 pandemic. The online Easter services included a short film that allowed viewers to choose their own ending.

Every year, Lia and How run the GenerationS Pastors Conference to train pastors from all around the world to build GenerationS in their churches. The church released its first book, GenerationS on 30 September 2021. Co-authored by How and Lia, the book chronicles 20 years of the church's history.

The church is registered with the National Council of Churches of Singapore (NCCS) and is an independent church with an independent board of directors, leadership and finances.

== Activities ==
=== Academic Excellence Programme ===
The church has a big focus on academic excellence and the creative expression of young people. The church was featured in The Straits Times on 27 November 2010 for encouraging a passion for study and creativity. During examination season, students are urged to study for at least 20 hours a week before they attend church. As a result, they have consistently outperformed the national average. To encourage studying and achieving good grades, the church disburses awards paid for from church coffers or donations by parents.

The church also encourages young people to excel in creative pursuits, and many have gone on to enjoy success in their chosen fields. The church provides the environment and equipment for young people to explore what they are good at, such as music, multimedia, lighting, dance and art.

=== Interfaith Community Work ===
The church intentionally builds bridges with other religious organisations to strengthen social cohesion in Singapore. In April 2016, the church launched three joint community programmes with Khalid Mosque and Geylang United Temple. The three initiatives launched were a combined tuition programme, a football coaching and mentoring programme headed by national footballer Isa Halim, and a blood donation drive. The event was held in collaboration with the Geylang Serai Inter-Racial and Religious Confidence Circle (IRCC) and Berita Harian.

On 4 April 2021, The Straits Times featured the church's interfaith collaboration with Khalid Mosque as a portrait of how the national ideal of harmony plays out on the ground in many everyday events. For example, during the pandemic, youth volunteers from the church prepared care gifts for COVID-19 front-line workers together with youths from the mosque. They also lent a hand at the mosque's Charity Briyani, where meals were packed and sold to raise funds for children's education.

=== Interfaith.sg ===
An online playbook, Interfaith.sg encouraging more interfaith activities in Singapore was developed by Heart of God Church and Khalid Mosque youths. The website helps religious groups and charities planning interfaith events navigate through the challenges with checklists and insights.

=== Joint Tuition Programme with Khalid Mosque ===
The joint tuition programme with Khalid Mosque was featured on The Straits Times and CNA on 19 June 2019 as Singapore hosted the inaugural International Conference for Cohesive Societies, where President Halimah Yacob announced the signing of the Commitment to Safeguard Religious Harmony in Singapore. Heart of God Church was one of the 250 religious organisations that signed the Commitment.

=== Joint Interfaith Annual Blood Donation Drive ===
Heart of God Church has organised seven joint blood donation drives with Khalid Mosque and Geylang United Temple. The blood donation took place on Heart of God Church's and Khalid Mosque's premises. The programme was launched with the belief that "under every skin colour and every creed, we all bleed the same colour – red. The Malay blood can save a Chinese man. The Hindu blood can save a Christian man."

=== Heart For Our Heroes Initiatives ===
As part of its Heart For Our Heroes initiatives during the COVID-19 pandemic, Heart of God Church partnered with different religious organizations to give out thousands of care packs and cards to medical professionals, frontline workers in the Changi Airport Group, hawker centre cleaners, and others.

=== Heart Community Services ===
Heart Community Services is a fund established by Heart of God Church in 2008 to provide financial and educational support, as well as social services to the local community. Through it, pocket money, opportunity grants and scholarships are disbursed to young people from less well-to-do backgrounds, or whose families are going through a financial crisis.

From April to June 2020, funds donated to Heart Community Services went towards an allocated budget that supported those whose families and livelihoods were significantly affected by COVID-19. Over the three months, the church gave S$170,100 in financial aid to 144 church members. One hundred recipients were students.

== Discography ==
- Sound of Revival (2018)
- XYZ (2022)
- Not Afraid (2022)
- But If Not (2024)
- Came Up New feat. Matt Redman (2024)
- Can't Stop Won't Stop feat. Matt Redman (2024)
