= Mayang Sari Beach Resort =

Hotel and resort in Bintan, Indonesia

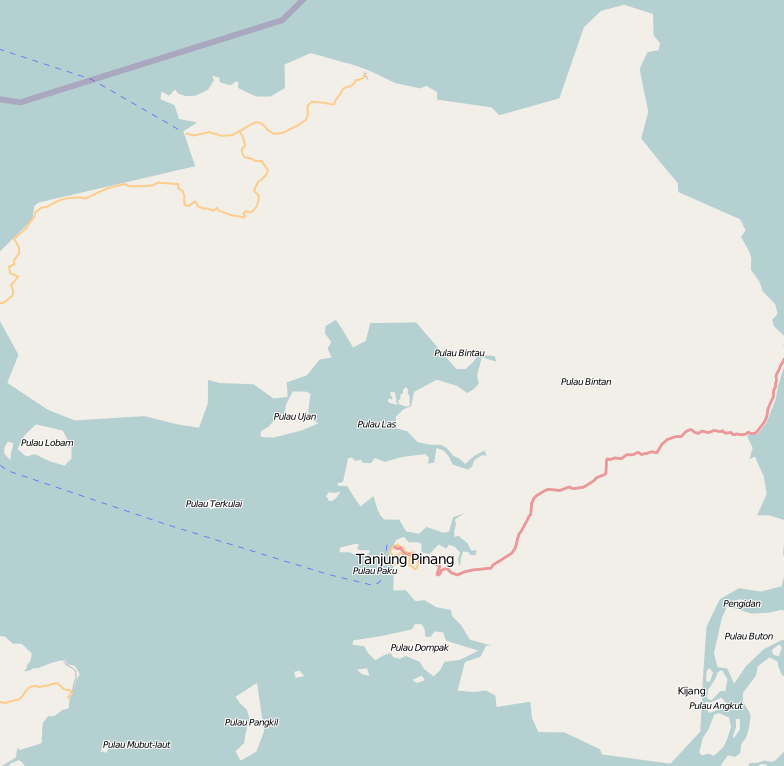
- Location in Bintan

General information
- Location: Bintan, Riau Islands, Indonesia
- Coordinates: 1°10′48.5″N 104°21′27.3″E

Website
- mayangsaribeachresort.com

Mayang Sari Beach Resort is a hotel and resort on the northwestern coast of Bintan, Indonesia.

The resort can be reached from Singapore or from Hang Nadim International Airport by a one-hour ferry ride.

== History ==
Mayang Sari Beach Resort opened in March 1995. It was the first venture of SMI Hotels & Resorts in Indonesia. The Tanah Merah Ferry Terminal in Singapore began operation in November 1995, providing a new way to reach the island. As of 2024 the resort was part of the Nirwana Gardens Bintan hotel chain.

== Features ==
The three-star hotel has about fifty chalets built of traditional bamboo and straw materials, set in the gardens or along the beach, each with a bedroom, living room, bathroom and terrace. The chalets have wooden interiors, and are air conditioned.

Facilities include a spa, restaurants and bar. The Kelong seafood restaurant is on stilts over the water and serves Indonesian and Chinese cuisine. The Rin restaurant has Japanese cuisine. As of 2023 the resort had a paintball arena catering to players of all levels of skill. Other facilities include a swimming pool and a sauna. Babysitting service is available.
