= Donkey stone =

Scouring block from northern England

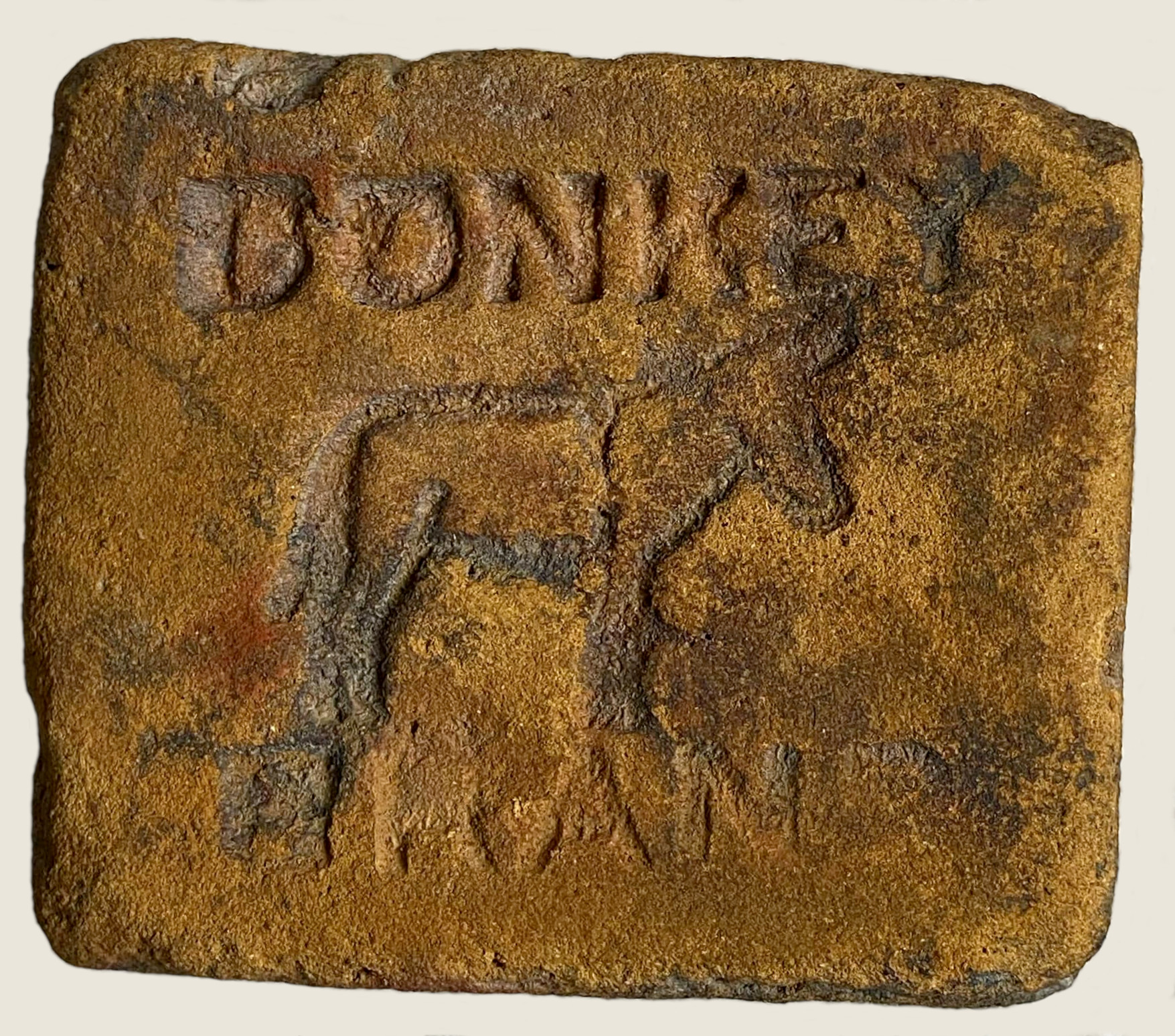
An Edward Read stone

A donkey stone was a type of scouring block, used mostly in the mill towns of the North of England to highlight the leading edge of stone steps.

== Etymology ==
The 'donkey brand' was originally the trade mark of a Manchester company called Edward Read & Son, who were one of several makers of the stones. Other companies used other animal designs or simple lettering, but the name 'donkey stone' stuck.

In parts of Greater Manchester, the practice of using donkey stone was described as 'brownstoning the step'.

== Usage ==
Donkey stones were first used in textile mills to clean greasy steps, and give them a non-slip finish, however the stones also became popular with housewives who would use them to give doorsteps and flagged floors a decorative finish. After mopping, a damp donkey stone would be rubbed around the outside edge of a flagged stone floor or along the leading edge and sides of a stone door-step. When skilfully applied the dried residue would give a neat contrasting border or line. It was not very durable and would have to be refreshed on a regular basis. Quite often the stones would be given out in exchange for old clothes or scrap metal, by rag totters, or rag and bone men as they were sometimes called.

== Manufacture ==
Donkey stones were made from a mixture of pulverised stone, cement, bleach powder and water. The mixture was ground up into a thick paste and then formed into a rectangular slab on a bench. The slab was then cut up to form the individual stones. The finished stones were then placed on racks to dry, usually for several days, although sometimes the drying process would take longer if the weather was cold and damp. Donkey stones were made in three different colours; brown, using a type of sandstone called cotta stone from Northampton; white, using a type of stone from Appley Bridge quarry near Wigan, and cream, using a blend of the two.

== Decline ==
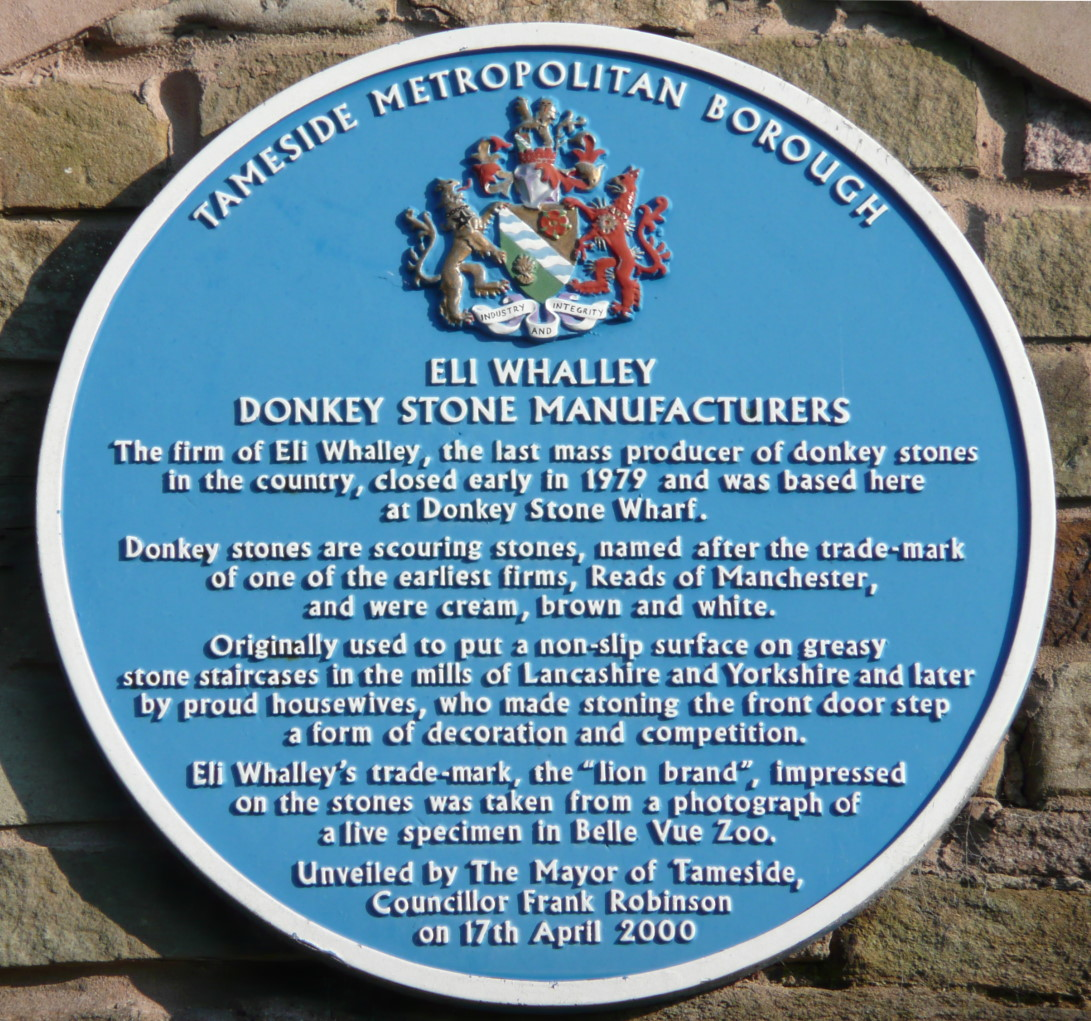
Eli Whalley blue plaque

The use of donkey stones gradually died out during the 1950s and 60s. The last big manufacturer of the stones was a company called Eli Whalley, founded in the 1890s, in Ashton-under-Lyne, which ceased trading in 1979. Some of that company's old machinery is preserved at the town's Portland Basin Industrial Museum, and a blue plaque commemorates the site of the old works at Donkey Stone Wharf on the canal. Eli Whalley's stones were sold under the Lion Brand trade mark, the design of which was based on a photograph of a live specimen at Belle Vue Zoo. Another manufacturer was also based on Donkey Stone Wharf; they were called J. Meakin and Sons and made the "Pony Brand" donkey stone. They were in operation until the late 1960s. Donkey stones are still sold in certain northern markets and towns, their production being continued in Colne, Lancashire by Chris Fawcett.
