= Rag-and-bone man =

Traditional name for some income-seekers

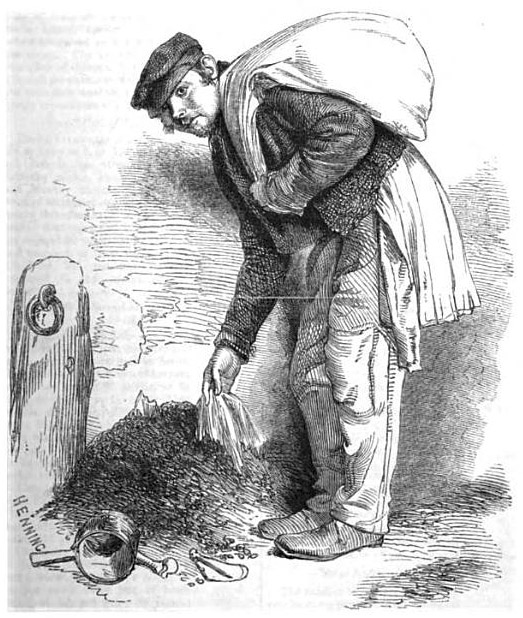
The Bone-Grubber by Richard Beard. Henry Mayhew described one bone-grubber he encountered as wearing a "ragged coat ... greased over, probably with the fat of the bones he gathered."

A rag-and-bone man (Note: Also called a ragpicker, ragman, old-clothesman, junkman, junk dealer, bone-grubber, bone-picker, chiffonnier, rag-gatherer, rag-picker, bag board, tatter or totter.) collects unwanted household items and sells them to merchants. Scraps of cloth and paper could be turned into cardboard, while broken glass could be melted down and reused, and even dead cats and dogs could be skinned to make clothes. Traditionally, this was a task performed on foot, with the scavenged materials (which included rags, bones, and various metals to be scrapped) kept in a small bag slung over the shoulder. Some rag-and-bone men used a cart, sometimes pulled by a horse or pony.

In the 19th century, rag-and-bone men typically lived in extreme poverty, surviving on the proceeds of what they collected each day. Conditions for rag-and-bone men in general improved following the Second World War, but the trade declined during the latter half of the 20th century. In the 21st century, rag-and-bone-style collection continues, partly as the result of the soaring price of scrap metal, particularly in the developing world.

== 19th century ==
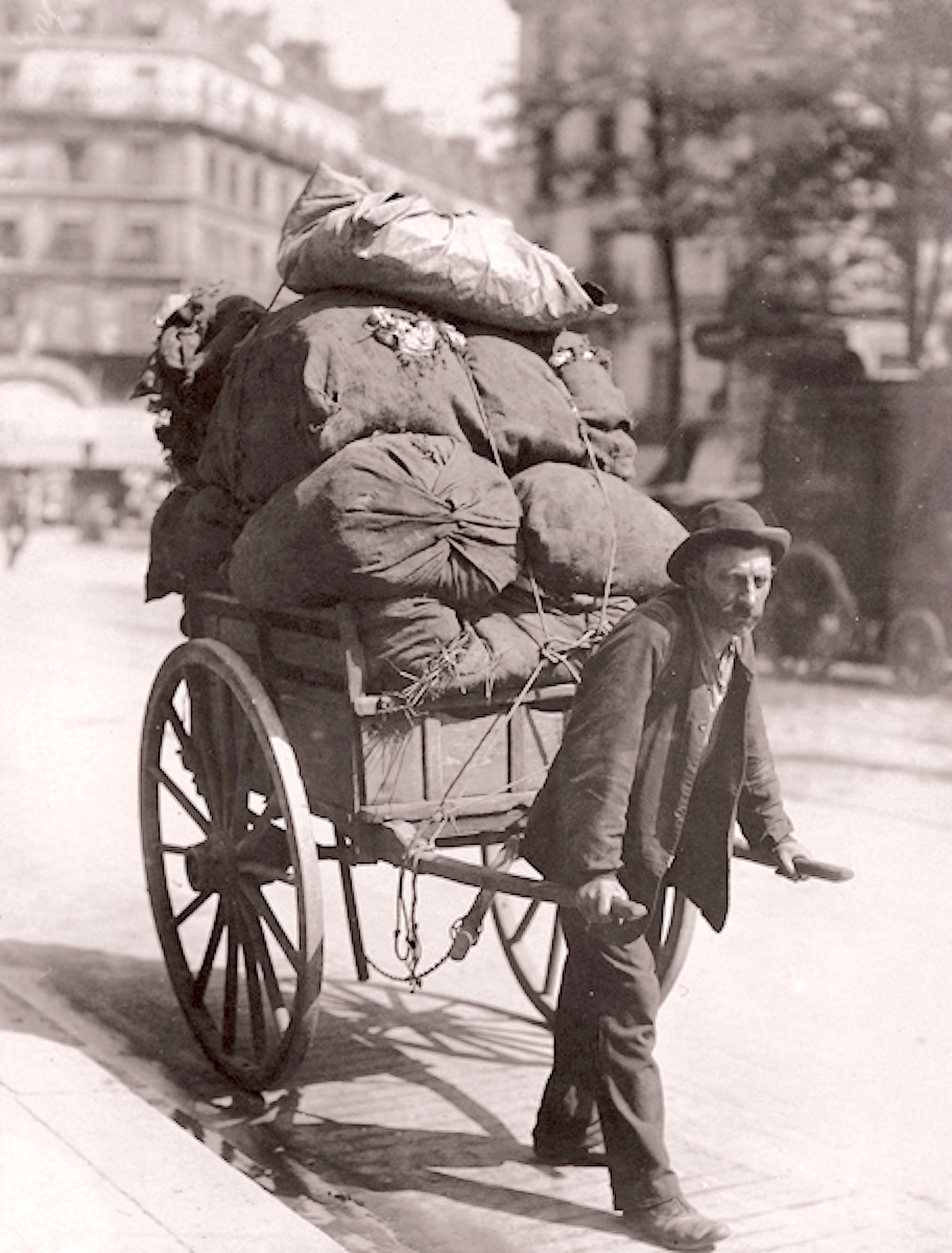
Rag-and-bone man in Paris in 1899 (Photo Eugène Atget)

In the UK, 19th-century rag-and-bone men scavenged unwanted rags, bones, metal, and other waste from the towns and cities in which they lived. Henry Mayhew's 1851 report London Labour and the London Poor estimates that in London, between 800 and 1,000 "bone-grubbers and rag-gatherers" lived in lodging houses, garrets and "ill-furnished rooms in the lowest neighbourhoods."

The bone-picker and rag-gatherer may be known at once by the greasy bag which he carries on his back. Usually he has a stick in his hand, and this is armed with a spike or hook, for the purpose of more easily turning over the heaps of ashes or dirt that are thrown out of the houses, and discovering whether they contain anything that is saleable at the rag-and-bottle or marine-store shop.

— Henry Mayhew

These bone-grubbers, as they were sometimes known, would typically spend nine or ten hours per day searching the streets of London for anything of value, before returning to their lodgings to sort whatever they had found. In rural areas where no rag merchants were present, rag-and-bone men often dealt directly with rag paper makers, but in London they sold rag to the local traders. White rag could fetch two to three pence per pound, depending on condition (all rag had to be dry before it could be sold). Coloured rag was worth about two pence per pound. Bones, worth about the same, could be used as knife handles, toys and ornaments, and, when treated, for chemistry. The grease extracted from them was also useful for soapmaking. Metal was more valuable; an 1836 edition of Chambers's Edinburgh Journal describes how "street-grubber[s]" could be seen scraping away the dirt between the paving stones of non-macadamised roads, searching for horseshoe nails. Brass, copper and pewter were valued at about four to five pence per pound. In a typical day, a rag-and-bone man might expect to earn about sixpence.

Mayhew's report indicates that many who worked as rag-and-bone men did so after falling on hard times, and generally lived in squalor. Although they usually started work well before dawn, they were not immune to the public's ire; in 1872, several rag-and-bone men in Westminster caused complaint when they emptied the contents of two dust trucks to search for rags, bones and paper, blocking people's path.

The ragpickers in the 19th and early 20th centuries did not recycle the materials themselves. They would simply collect whatever they could find and turn it over to a "master ragpicker" (usually a former ragpicker) who would, in turn, sell it—generally by weight—to wealthy investors with the means to convert the materials into something more profitable.

In the West Riding of Yorkshire, rag-and-bone men would collect waste woollen and rag products from householders to sell on to the 'shoddy' factories. Shoddy, cloth made from recycled wool, was first manufactured (and probably invented) by Benjamin Law in Batley, West Yorkshire, in 1813. The process involved grinding woollen rags into a fibrous mass and mixing this with some fresh wool. Law's nephews later came up with a similar process involving felt or hard-spun woollen cloth, the product in this case being called 'mungo'. Samuel Parr was the first producer of mungo in 1834. He used old coats and trousers, tailors' clippings, ground up to produce shorter fibres than shoddy. In the shoddy preparation process, the rags were sorted, and any seams, or parts of the rag not suitable, were left to rot and then sold on to farmers to manure crops, or they were used for bedding or stuffing. The remaining wool rags were then sent to the shoddy mills for processing. For several decades shipments of rags even arrived from continental Europe. Shoddy and mungo manufacture was, by the 1860s, a huge industry in West Yorkshire, particularly in and around the Batley, Dewsbury and Ossett areas.

Although it was solely a job for the lowest of the working classes, ragpicking was considered an honest occupation, more on the level of street sweeper than of a beggar. In Paris, ragpickers were regulated by law and could operate only at night. They were required to return unusually valuable items either to the items' owners or to the authorities. When Eugène Poubelle introduced the rubbish bin in 1884, he was criticised by French newspapers for meddling with the ragpickers' livelihood.

== 20th century ==
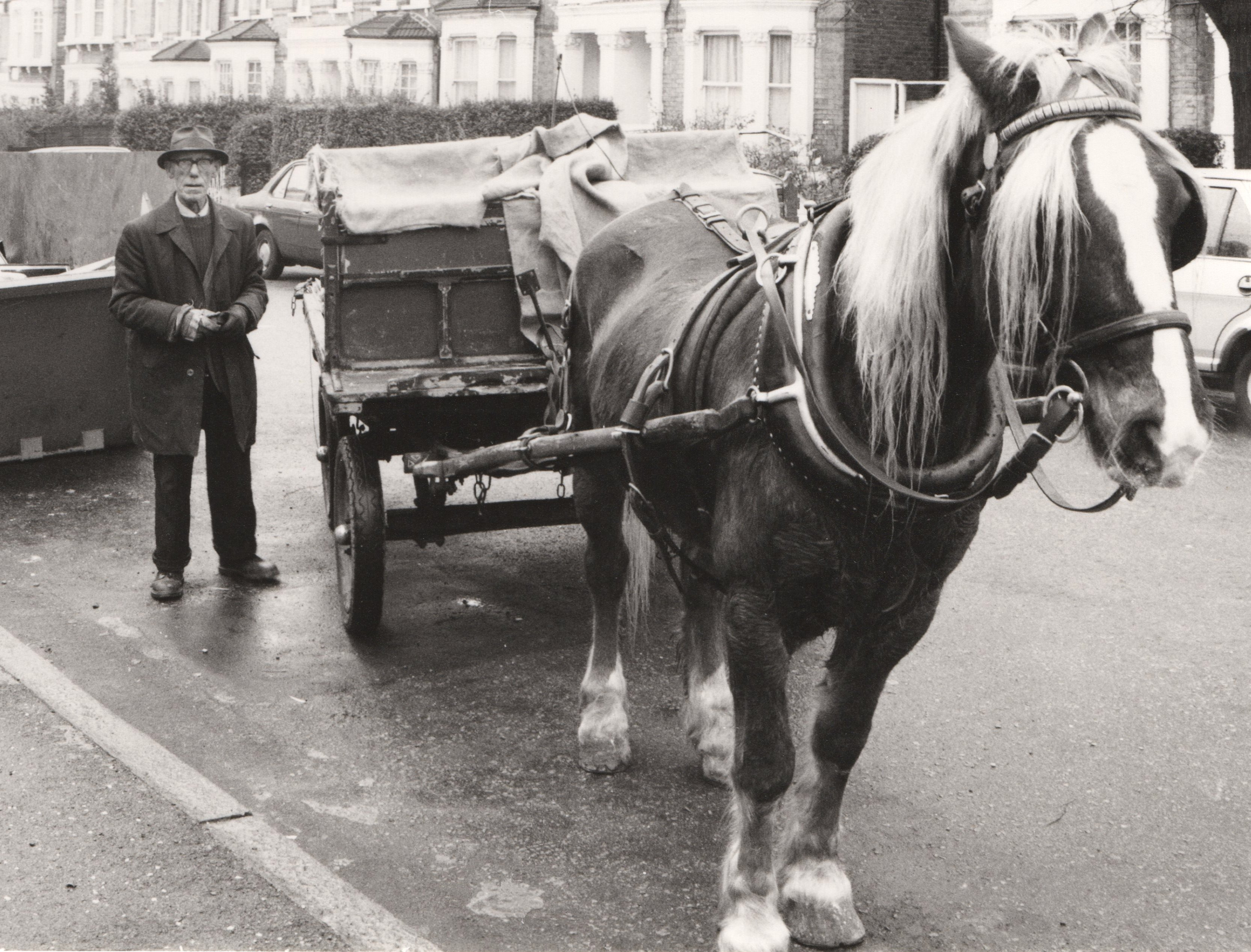
A rag-and-bone man with his horse and cart on the streets of Streatham, south-west London in 1985

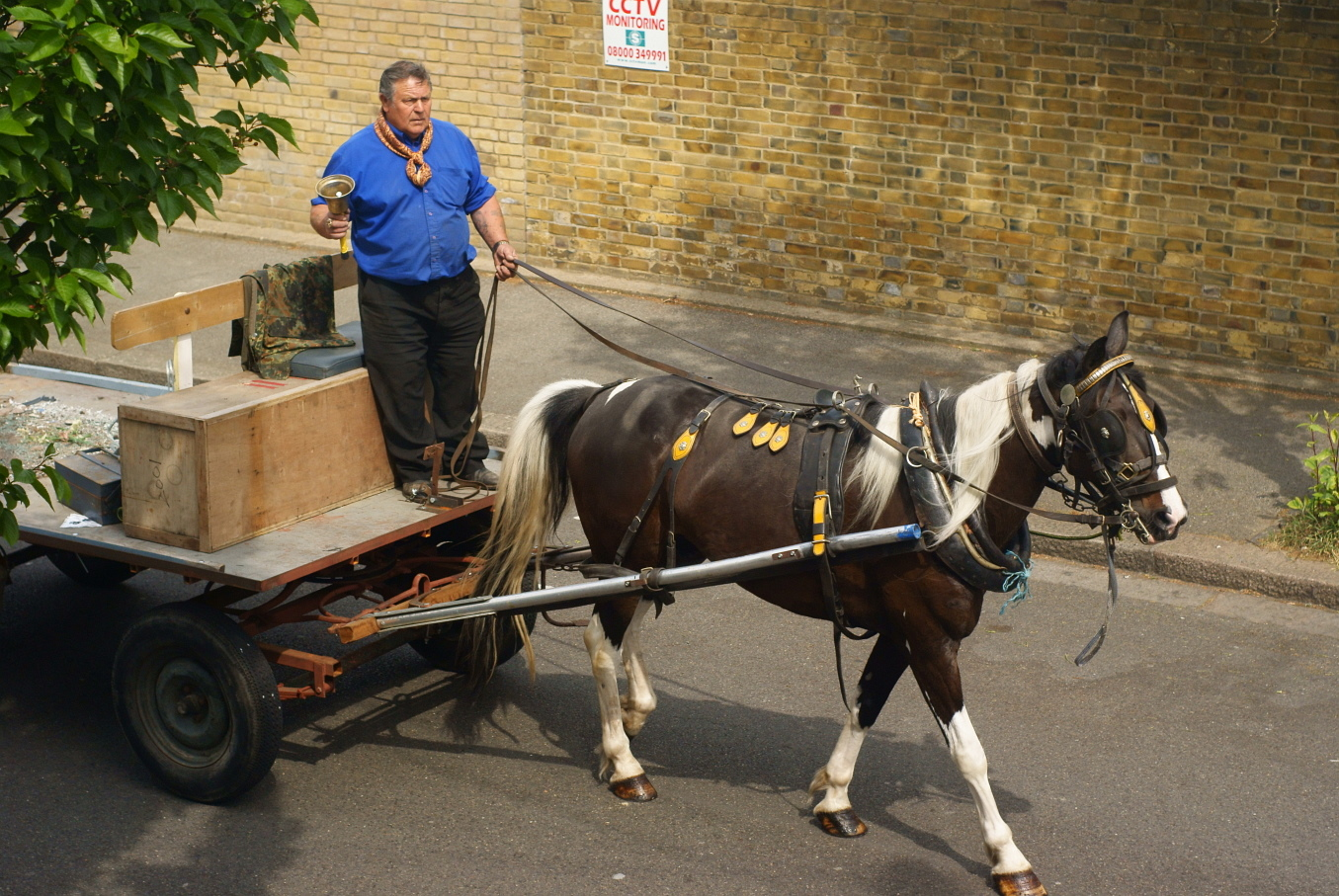
A rag-and-bone man in Croydon, London, May 2011

A 1954 report in The Manchester Guardian mentioned that some men could make as much as £25 (roughly equivalent to £594 now) per day collecting rags. Most used handcarts rather than a bag, and some used a pony and cart, giving out rubbing stones (Note: It had long been customary for rag-and-bone men to "purchase" items from children with a small gift, but the Public Health Act 1936 stated that, as a defence against the spread of disease, rag-and-bone men could not give children under 14 "any article whatsoever". Goldfish, popular items for trade, were later declared not to be articles.) in exchange for the items that they collected. In 1958, a Manchester Guardian reporter accompanied rag-and-bone man John Bibby as he made his rounds through Chorlton and Stretford, near Manchester. For his handcart's load, which comprised rags, furs, shoes, scrap car parts, a settee and other furniture, Bibby made about £2. Shoddy and mungo manufacture in West Yorkshire continued into the 1950s and the rag man would set up his cart in local streets and weigh the wool or rags brought by the women whom they then paid.

By the mid-1960s the rag-and-bone trade as a whole had fallen into decline; in the 1950s, Manchester and Salford had, between them, around sixty rag merchants, but this had dropped to about twelve by 1978, many having moved into the scrap-metal trade. Local merchants blamed several factors, including demographic changes, for the decline of their industry.

A 1965 newspaper report estimated that in London, only a "few hundred" rag-and-bone men remained, possibly because of competition from more specialised trades, such as corporation dustmen, and pressure from property developers to build on rag merchants' premises.

In the 1980s, Hollywood star Kirk Douglas mentioned in an interview with Johnny Carson that his father was a ragman in New York and "young people nowadays don't know what is ragman."

A pre-recorded and amplified scrap iron collector's call
Recorded in Birmingham, England in 2023

The music hall song "Any Old Iron" (recorded in 1911) and BBC's popular 1960s–1970s television comedy Steptoe and Son helped to maintain the rag-and-bone man's status in British folklore, but by the 1980s they were all but gone. However, in more recent years, rising scrap metal prices have prompted their return, although most drive vans rather than horses and carts, and they announce their presence by megaphone, causing some members of the public to complain about noise pollution.

== 21st century ==
Ragpicking is still widespread in developing countries, such as in Mumbai, India, where it offers the poorest in society around the rubbish and recycling areas a chance to earn a hand-to-mouth supply of money. In 2015, the Environment Minister of India declared a national award to recognise the service rendered by ragpickers. The award, with a cash prize of Rs. 1.5 lakh, is for three best rag pickers and three associations involved in innovation of best practices.

Ragpicking has a positive impact on urban spaces with a weak waste management infrastructure. In India, the economic activity of ragpicking is worth about ₹3200 crore. India was also found to have a near-90% recycle rate for PET bottles, which can most likely be attributed to ragpicking, considering the lack of solid-waste management and under-developed waste collection and recycling culture in that country.

== See also ==
- Glossary of textile manufacturing
- Junk man
- Karung guni, a counterpart similar to a rag-and-bone man in Singapore
- Waste collector
- Zabbaleen, a group of people in Egypt who operate in a similar manner
- rag & bone, US based high-end fashion retailer
