= Tanah Merah Ferry Terminal =

Ferry terminal in Singapore

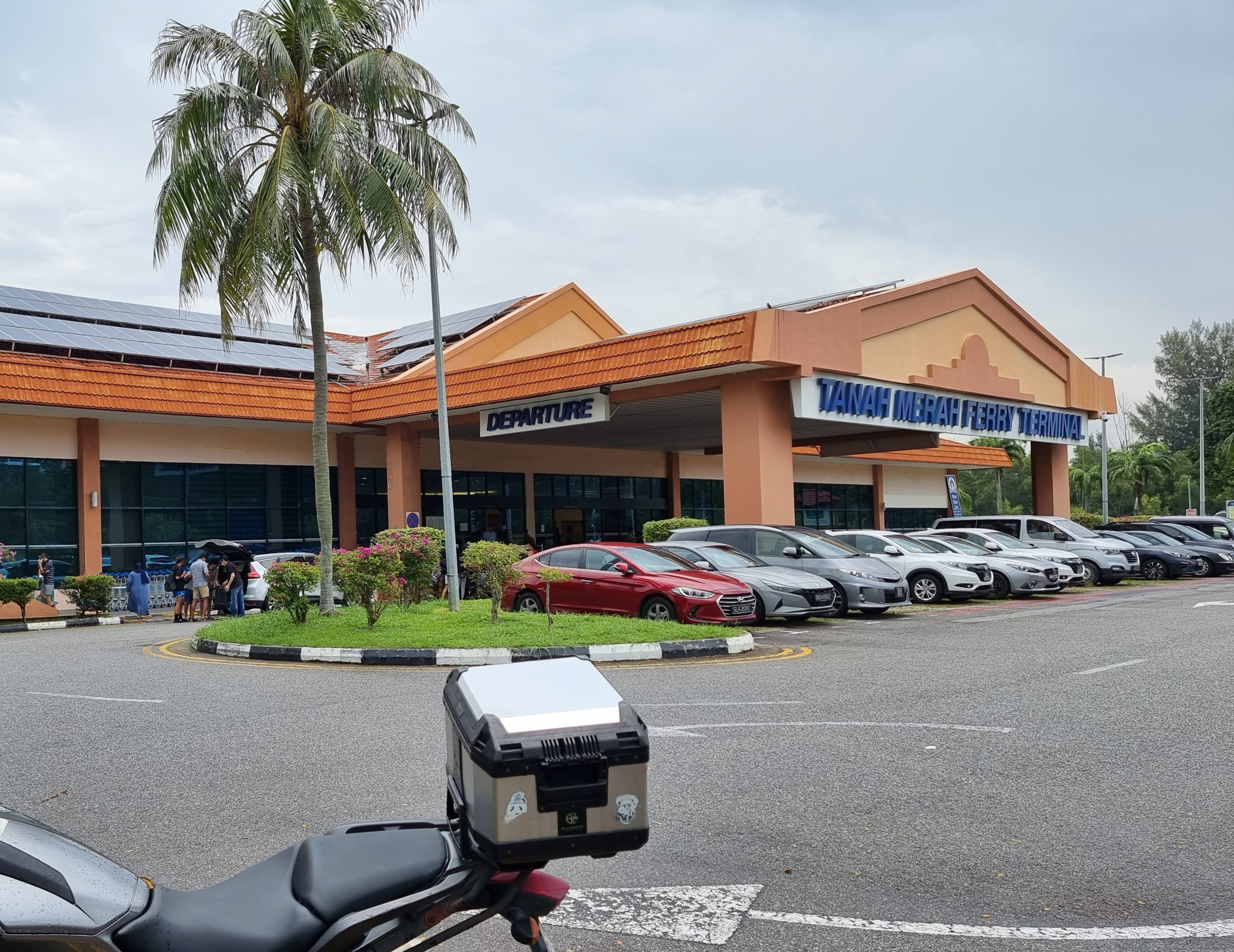

- Location within Singapore

General information
- Status: Operating
- Type: Passenger terminal
- Location: 50 Tanah Merah Ferry Road, Singapore 498833
- Coordinates: 1.3135418°N 103.98825°E
- Construction started: April 1992; 34 years ago
- Inaugurated: 10 November 1995; 30 years ago
- Renovated: 2025; 1 year ago
- Operator: Singapore Cruise Centre

Design and construction
- Developer: Port of Singapore Authority

Website
- https://singaporecruise.com.sg/terminal/tanah-merah-ferry-terminal/

The Tanah Merah Ferry Terminal is a ferry terminal in eastern Singapore, located within the Changi planning area. The terminal serves ferry services to the Indonesian islands of Batam and Bintan, and Desaru, in Johor, Malaysia. It is owned and managed by Singapore Cruise Centre.

== History ==
The terminal was constructed in 1995 at a cost of S$29 million with the intention of boosting tourism. The terminal began operations on 26 August. In 2007, the terminal, along with the Singapore Cruise Centre, received a $2.5 million IT upgrade, along with a $3 million facelift.

In 2010, bus service 570 was introduced to carry passengers between the terminal and Tanah Merah MRT station and Bedok MRT station. Bus services 35/35M has since replaced it.

On 21 June 2022, the Maritime and Port Authority of Singapore announced that they have approved ferry services between the terminal and Desaru Coast Ferry Terminal in Johor, Malaysia. Ferry services to Desaru Coast began on 7 July 2022 and is operated by Desaru Link Ferry Services.

On 2 February 2024, Singapore Cruise Centre announced that the terminal will undergo a S$20m upgrade. As part of the upgrade, the terminal will see its capacity increase by 20% and the installation of self-service check-in kiosks and unmanned bag-drop machines. There would also be new ferry operator counters, more food and beverage options for passengers, as well as an expanded and redesigned departure hall with a 70% capacity increase and an additional lounge. The upgrades were completed and unveiled by Minister of State for Transport and Law Murali Pillai on 22 March 2025. Aside from new facilities, the terminal now has a playground for families while waiting for their trips.

== Incident ==
On 25 November 2016, a 54-year old woman named Maimunah Awang, who worked as a cleaner at the terminal, was found dead in a drain at the ferry terminal compound. A 23-year old Malaysian man was subsequently charged with her murder. The man, identified as Ahmad Muin Yaacob, was a colleague of Maimunah. He was found guilty of murder and sentenced to life imprisonment and eighteen strokes of the cane in November 2020.
