= SGSecure =

Singaporean national movement

SGSecure is a national movement in Singapore. It was launched by Prime Minister Lee Hsien Loong on 24 September 2016 to prepare the public and to better respond in the event of a terrorist attack. It has since evolved into multiple different campaigns which now includes being vigilant against fake news and maintaining social cohesion.

== History ==
Mr Lee said the Government has stepped up its measures against terrorism, but its efforts alone are not enough. "Terrorism threatens not just our physical safety, but also our social harmony and way of life," he said. "To protect ourselves, every Singaporean has to play his part."

"SGSecure gives everybody a role in protecting ourselves, our families and our country," he added. "SGSecure will teach you the skills you need to do so."

SGSecure focus on three main actions for citizens to follow in the fight against terrorism.

1. Staying Alert - Being vigilant to prevent a terrorist attack in order to keep the community and loved ones safe.
2. Staying United - Remaining cohesive as a community by building ties with the community and safeguard the racial and religious harmony in Singapore.
3. Staying Strong - Being resilient as individuals and as a community in the face of crisis, so that everyone returns to normalcy quickly after a terror attack.

== Run, Hide, Tell & Press, Tie, Tell ==
The SGSecure movement originally begun with the run, hide, tell movement, as an advisory on what to do in the event of a terror attack. It also included "Press, Tie, Tell" as an advisory for providing improvised first aid with commonly available items to help those injured in an attack.

== SG Secure Responders ==
The movement now encompasses the preparedness for different types of emergencies, where members of the public who have the skill to provide:

1. Cardiopulmonary resuscitation
2. First aid
3. Basic Firefighting
4. Psychological first aid

are encouraged to sign up as a SGSecure responder. Responders would have to download the SGSecure App, which allows them to report terror attacks. The cardiac arrest or fire alerts were later integrated into the myResponder App which is under the Singapore Civil Defence Force instead.

== Series: What's Your Role In Keeping SG Secure? ==
In 2023, a new tagline "What's Your Role?" was released in July. It comprises six roles, fact-checker, guardian, lifesaver, lookout, true friend and uniter. Each role was an important skill that the public was supposed to possess.

1. Fact-checker: Able to spot fake news, knowing how to check information through reliable sources.
2. Guardian: Knowing how to remain calm in the event of a crisis and directing oneself and others to escape to safety through the "Run, Hide, Tell" advisory.
3. Lifesaver: Knowing first aid and CPR skills and being ready to use them to save lives in the event of a crisis
4. Lookout: Being alert when in public areas for suspicious items or people
5. True friend: Providing others in the community with help and also looking out for those who may have been radicalised
6. Uniter: Maintaining racial harmony within the community by fostering a sense of togetherness

== Series: When Terror Strikes, Are We Ready? ==
The Ministry of Home Affairs (Singapore) created a three-part series which involved controlled scenarios where social experiments were carried out to test whether people were ready in times of crisis. The first episode had eight local influencers undergo a simulation of an armed intruded in a workplace, while the other episodes involved placing an unattended luggage bag at Our Tampines Hub and a car with gas cylinders parked at a carpark. The production team monitored the public's reaction to the situation by checking if the noticed the object or "acted" by informing the authorities.

== Government Awareness ==
Together with the Ministry of Manpower (Singapore), the SGSecure@Workspaces initiative includes Business Continuity Planning (BCP) workshops and counter terrorism seminars for industry-specific practices.

In 2023, together with the Singapore Red Cross Society, SGSecure organised a psychological first aid seminar to help improve the public providing psychological first aid at workplaces to reduce the chance of Post-traumatic stress disorder
