= Run, hide, tell =

UK public safety technique

Run, hide, tell is a simple technique used for public security in the United Kingdom in the event of a firearms- or weapons-based terrorist attack. It was introduced by the Metropolitan Police Service in 2017.

The three elements of the advice are:

1. Run to a place of safety. This is a far better option than to surrender or negotiate. If there's nowhere to go, then...
2. Hide – It's better to hide than to confront. Remember to turn your phone to silent and turn off vibrate. Barricade yourself in if you can. Then finally and only when it is safe to do so...
3. Tell the police by calling 999.

== Videos ==
The National Police Chiefs' Council has released short public information films that contain the "Run, Hide, Tell" advice. The videos include:

- Run, Hide, Tell: Firearms and Weapons Attack on YouTube; and
- Run, Hide, Tell: Advice For Young People on YouTube.
