= SGInnovate =

Singapore government investment initiative

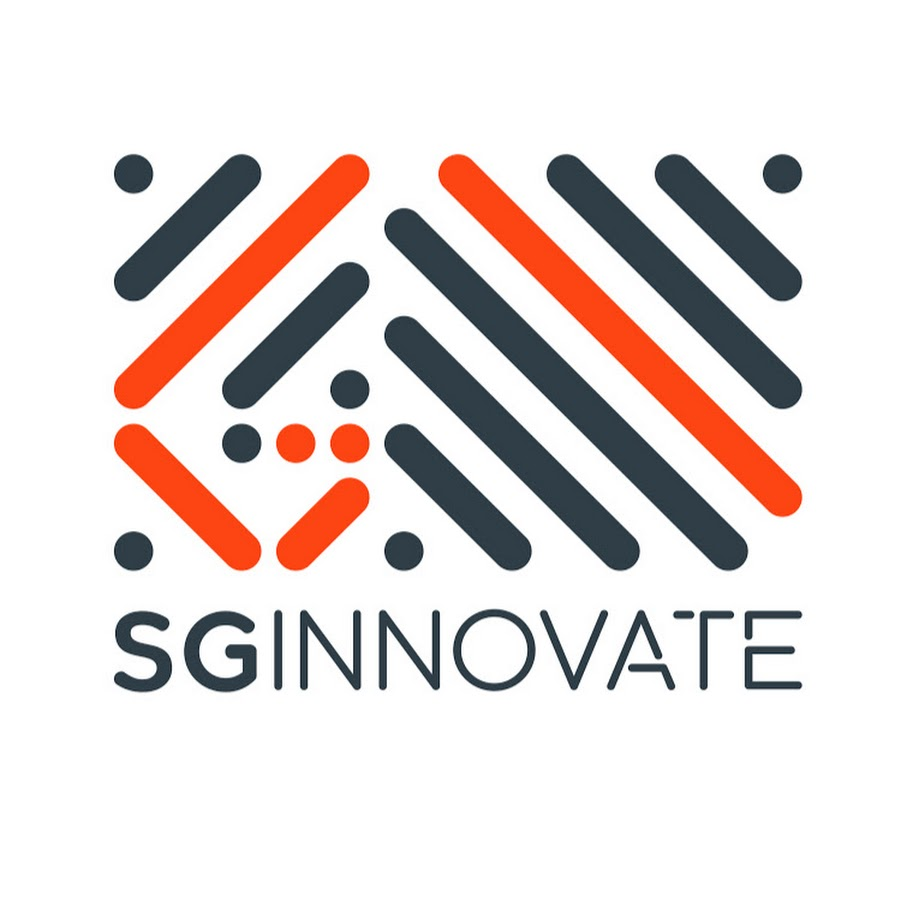
- Company type: Investment
- Industry: Deep technology
- Founded: 22 November 2016; 8 years ago
- Founder: Steve Leonard (Founding CEO)
- Headquarters: Singapore, Singapore
- Key people: Lim Jui (CEO); Yong Ying-I (Chairman)
- Owner: Government of Singapore
- Website: www.sginnovate.com

SGInnovate is a government-owned innovation platform in Singapore centred on the development of deep technology. It was established in 2016 to consolidate innovation activities in Singapore. SGInnovate was founded to advance and scale deep technology products from Singapore.

SGInnovate manages a portion of the Startup SG Equity fund worth $200 million. It co-invests in startups that specialize in research-driven technology. It works with universities, polytechnics, and ecosystem companies and organisations.

== History ==
In 2017, SGInnovate announced Deep Tech Nexus. SGInnovate announced that it will invest in at least 20 startups founded in Singapore, and will host 15 thousand participants over more than 150 events in 2018.

In 2021, SGInnovate announced a three-year partnership with Singhealth to advance healthcare AI.

== See also ==
- Venture capital
- Deep tech
- Private equity
- Seed money
