= Karung guni =

Collection of unwanted items for a nominal fee

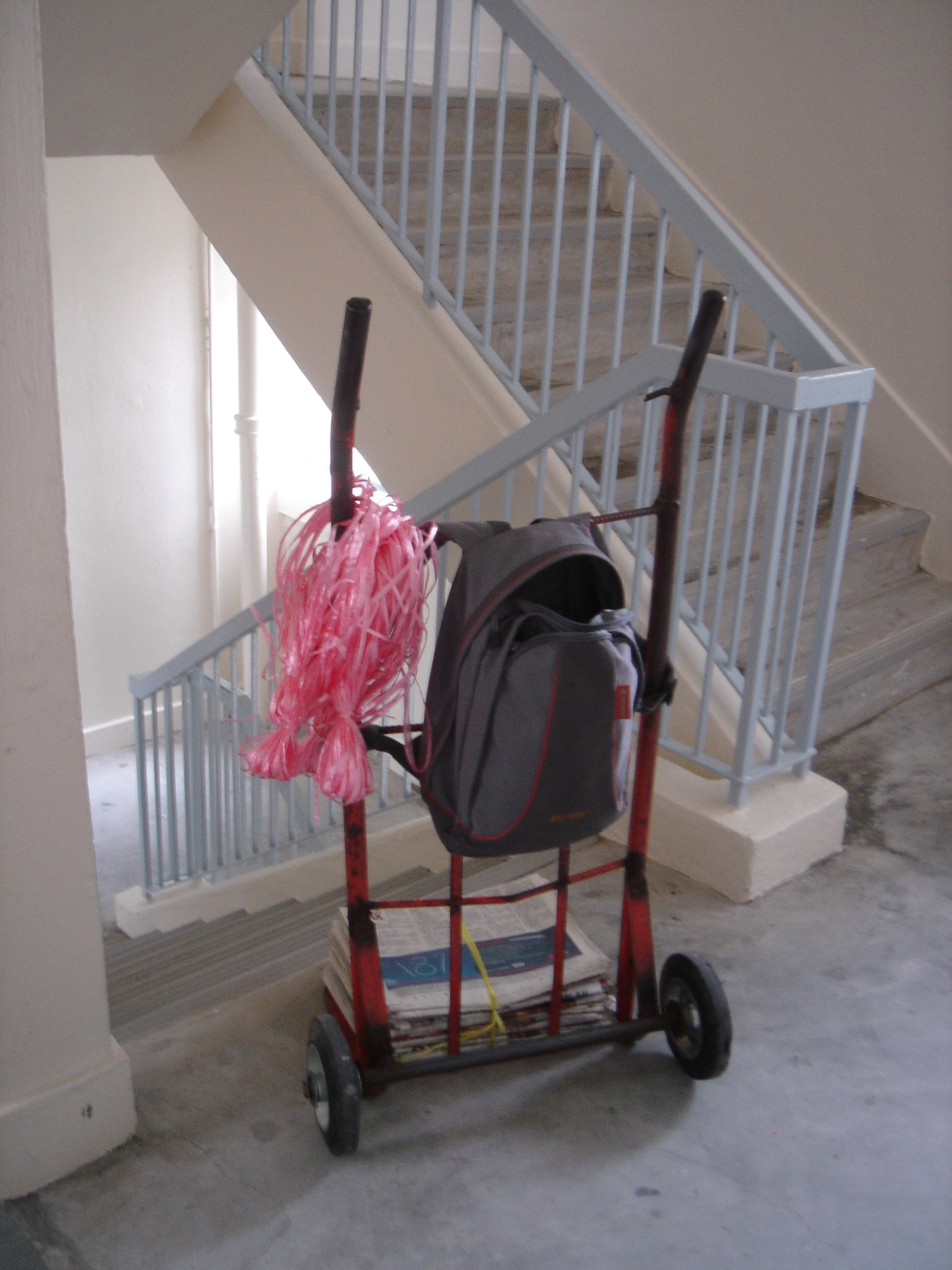
A traditional karang guni cart at a staircase landing

A karung guni (locally /ˌkɑːɹʌŋ ˈɡuːni, -ɒŋ -/, Malay pronunciation: [karɔŋ ɡuni]), also spelled as karang guni, is a type of scrap dealer in Singapore and Malaysia. Its practitioners are a modern form of rag and bone man that visit residences door-to-door to acquire unwanted items.

== Etymology ==
Karung guni is the Malay term for a gunny sack, that was used in the past to hold newspapers; the word is now used metonymically to refer to the rag and bone men or scrap dealers who, in the past, would haul the heavy sacks on their backs as they walked their rounds to collect items. Nowadays, most karung guni use hand trucks to move their items around.

== Business practice ==
Karung guni either walk along corridors (if that particular HDB estate has a multistorey car park) or for certain HDB estates where the carpark is right under the HDB blocks, walk through the carpark downstairs honking a horn. Around landed properties, they may drive around in a lorry with a horn attached to it, instead of going door-to-door. They make visits in carts, collecting old newspapers and other unwanted items. These will be resold at specialized markets and eventually recycled or reused.

These karung guni are distinguished by their use of horns and hand bells, as well as their shouts that can be heard as they make their rounds in high-density residential areas: karang guni, poh zhua, gu sa kor, pai leh lio, dian si ki... (Note: Singaporean Hokkien: karung guni，報紙，舊衫褲，歹黎撩，電視機; Pe̍h-ōe-jī: karang guni, pò-chóa, kū saⁿ-khò͘, pháiⁿ lê-liô, tiān-sī-ki) (“Karung guni, newspapers and old clothes, spoilt radios, televisions”). Depending on the person, a nominal fee is paid for the quantity of newspapers or unwanted items sold.

The karung guni industry is made highly profitable due to the dense urban nature of Singapore, where hundreds of public housing apartment units are located in one block, with often a dozen blocks in each housing estate. This gives the karang guni men large access to sources of scrap. There are reported stories of rag-to-riches, karung guni men who have become millionaires just from the karang guni business. Today, however, competition is usually too great due to the over-saturation.

In the past, second-hand items in good condition bought by the karung guni are usually resold in flea markets such at the now defunct Sungei Road, though in recent times some have begun listing items additionally on online auctions. Because karung guni are motivated by the resale value of these materials on the market, there are also reported cases where some collectors have been selective in what to receive from households, even though they may be still recyclable or reusable.

At the beginning of the 21st century, karung guni men have been facing competition due to recycling initiatives and charities that directly collect from residents material to be recycled.

== See also ==
- Culture of Singapore
