= Racial Harmony Day =

Singaporean holiday

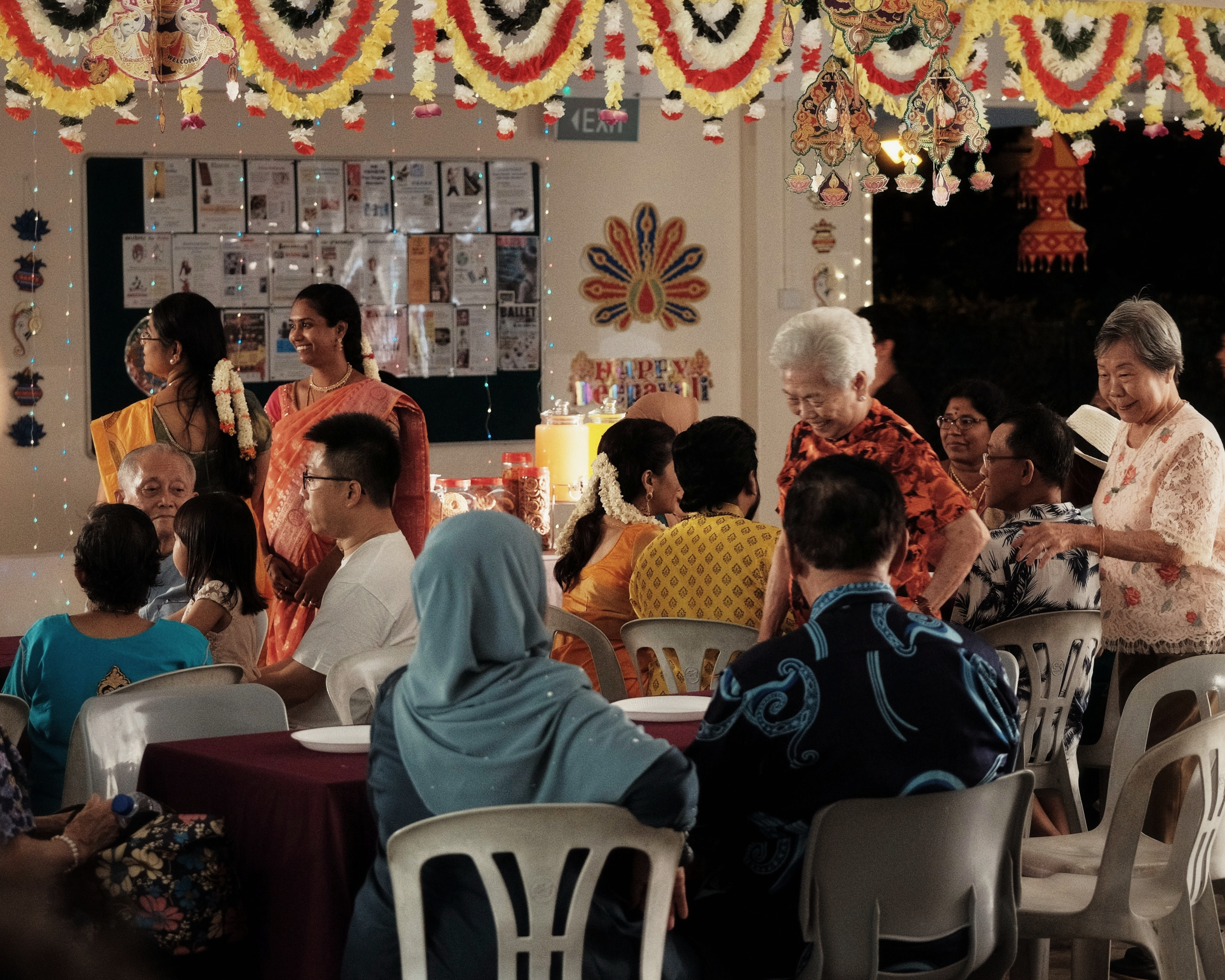
- A Deepavali celebration in Singapore organised by a community centre where different races are invited.
- Observed by: Singapore
- Type: Secular
- Significance: Commemorates the 1964 racial riots
- Date: 21 July
- Next time: 21 July 2026
- Frequency: Annually

Racial Harmony Day is a day in Singapore to promote racial and ethnic harmony within the nation. It is observed on 21 July every year, with most activities organised by schools and grassroot organisations, including religious groups.

== History ==
First launched in 1997 by the Ministry of Education (MOE) in schools, the event commemorates the 1964 race riots which took place on 21 July and 2 September when Singapore was a state of Malaysia from 1963 to 1965. 36 people had lost their lives, hundreds were severely injured and thousands were detained. There were also numerous other communal riots and incidents throughout the 1950s and 1960s leading to and after Singapore's independence in August 1965.

Racial Harmony Day has since expanded its reach. Today, grassroots organisations such as the People's Association and the Community Development Councils are also involved.

=== Schools ===
On this day, students in schools across the nation are encouraged to be dressed in other cultures' traditional costumes such as the Cheongsam, the Baju Kurung or Saree. Traditional delicacies are a feature of the celebration. Traditional games such as five stones, zero points, and hopscotch are played, where inter-class competitions are sometimes organised. Some activities introduced by schools include designing Kolams and Maruthani and Henna hand painting. Students are also educated on racism and racial stereotypes.

== Declaration ==
Schools are also encouraged to recite a Declaration of Religious Harmony during the celebrations. In the week of 21 July, representatives from the Inter-Religious Harmony Circle (IRHC) comprising various religious groups also get together to pledge their support and to promote the Declaration.

== See also ==
- 1964 race riots in Singapore
- Maria Hertogh riots
- 13 May Incident
- Total Defence Day
