= Maid abuse =

Mistreatment of a domestic worker by an employer

Maid abuse is the maltreatment or neglect of a person hired as a domestic worker, especially by the employer or by a household member of the employer. It is any act or failure to act that results in harm to that employee. It takes on numerous forms, including physical, sexual, emotional, and economic abuse. The majority of perpetrators tend to be female employers and their children. These acts may be committed for a variety of reasons, including to instill fear in the victim, discipline them, or act in a way desired by the abuser.

The National Human Trafficking Hotline, operated by Polaris, a non-governmental organization in the United States, describes maid abuse as a form of human trafficking— it is "force, fraud, or coercion to maintain control over the worker and to cause the worker to believe that he or she has no other choice but to continue with the work," they stated. Although it can occur anywhere, it is most commonly experienced among domestic workers in Singapore.

== Prevalence ==
Maid abuse, though a global phenomenon, is especially prevalent in Singapore. According to a study by Research Across Borders, six out of ten Singaporean domestic workers experience some form of abuse at work. One in four reported physical violence. Additionally, one in seven Singaporeans have witnessed maid abuse.

Foreign domestic workers, who arrive in Singapore seeking employment, are at high risk of abuse. As maids are the only migrant workers not protected under Singapore's Employment Act, many end up in abusive situations. This is amplified due to the fact that foreign domestic worker contracts in Singapore lack live-out options; foreign maids reside in the same residence as their employers. Mistreatment of Singaporean foreign domestic workers is not uncommon and is widely detailed. They are subject to physical abuse, invasion of privacy, and sexual assault (including rape).

== Legislation ==
=== Singapore ===
In Singapore, it is against the law to abuse a foreign domestic worker. The Ministry of Manpower (MOM) says that perpetrators face severe penalties; if convicted, the perpetrator may face prison time, caning, or be fined as much as $20,000. The perpetrator will also be banned from further employment of foreign domestic workers.

=== Malaysia ===
In Malaysia, abused foreign domestic workers can obtain visas so that they may stay in the country to pursue legal complaints; the same is true in the United States.

== Notable cases ==
- On 2 December 2001, 19-year-old Indonesian maid Muawanatul Chasanah was found beaten to death in her house of employment in Chai Chee, Singapore. Her employer, Ng Hua Chye, was arrested and charged with her murder. It was revealed in Ng's 2-day trial that Ng had repeatedly punched, kicked and whipped the maid and even used burning cigarette butts and/or boiling hot water to burn the maid due to her supposed poor working performance and her stealing the food of Ng's infant daughter. He was sentenced to 18 years and six months in prison, along with 12 strokes of the cane.
- On 28 May 2002, Indonesian maid Sundarti Supriyanto killed her employer Angie Ng and Ng's daughter Crystal Poh, and set fire to Ng's Bukit Merah office in Singapore. Sundarti recounted that she was severely abused by Ng for minor mistakes, and even starved for days by Ng. She had endured much humiliation before she finally lost her control and fatally stabbed Ng (and her daughter) in a frenzied attack. The High Court of Singapore accepted that she indeed suffered from maid abuse and was not of her right mind when she was gravely provoked into committing the crime and lost control; therefore they acquitted Sundarti of murder and instead sentenced her to life imprisonment for culpable homicide not amounting to murder.
- On 26 July 2016, in Singapore, Burmese maid Piang Ngaih Don was killed by her employer, 41-year-old Gaiyathiri Murugayan. Murugayan was sentenced to 30 years in prison on 22 June 2021. She had earlier pleaded guilty to 28 charges out of a total of 115 relating to the murder and abuse of the maid, who worked for her family for a few months. The murder charge was reduced to the next highest charge of culpable homicide as Gaiyathiri was suffering from a mental disorder at the time she murdered Piang, meaning she would not be sentenced to death (which was the mandatory penalty for murder in Singapore). The prosecution sought a life sentence for the convicted maid killer, and while judge See Kee Oon did not hand out a life term, he agreed by saying that the conduct of Gaiyathiri were an abhorrence and outrage to human and public conscience. Gaiyathiri's mother was given a 17-year jail term for maid abuse while Gayathiri's husband, who also abused the maid, is currently on trial since 2023.
- On 25 June 2018, at a flat in Singapore’s Choa Chu Kang, 17-year-old Zin Mar Nwe, a foreign maid from Myanmar, used a knife to stab her employer’s mother-in-law 26 times, resulting in the death of the 70-year-old elderly Indian citizen. Zin Mar Nwe told police and the court that the victim had hit her and reprimanded her on several occasions, and the threat of being sent back to her home country caused her to be triggered and thus stabbed the elderly woman to death. Although Zin Mar Nwe was found guilty of murder nonetheless at the end of her trial on 18 May 2023, some of her claims of being abused by the victim were accepted by the trial court. She was sentenced to life imprisonment in July 2023.

== See also ==
- Domestic worker
- Domestic Worker's Bill of Rights
- Convention on Domestic Workers
