= 2016 Toa Payoh child abuse case =

2016 child abuse and murder case in Singapore

- Date: 23 October 2016
- Location: Toa Payoh, Singapore
- Outcome: Ridzuan serving one term of life imprisonment at Changi Prison; Azlin serving one term of life imprisonment at Changi Women's Prison
- Deaths: Five-year-old son of Azlin and Ridzuan
- Injuries: None
- Convicted: Azlin Arujunah; Ridzuan Mega Abdul Rahman
- Verdict: Guilty
- Convictions: Murder (Azlin; one count); Voluntarily causing grievous hurt by dangerous means (Ridzuan; four counts); Multiple charges of child abuse (Azlin and Ridzuan)
- Sentence: 28 years' imprisonment for Azlin by the High Court (2020; overturned); 27 years' imprisonment and 24 strokes of the cane for Ridzuan by the High Court (2020; overturned); Life imprisonment for Ridzuan by the Court of Appeal (2022); Life imprisonment for Azlin by the Court of Appeal (2022)

On 23 October 2016, a five-year-old boy was pronounced dead at a children's hospital in Singapore. He was found to have been a victim of child abuse by his parents Azlin binte Arujunah and Ridzuan bin Mega Abdul Rahman for months leading up to his death. This involved both Azlin and Ridzuan using boiling hot water to scald the boy on several occasions, inflicting severe burns and scald injuries which caused the boy to die in hospital weeks after the first of the four scalding incidents. The couple was later arrested and charged with murder. To protect his surviving siblings' identities and their privacy, the boy was not named in the media.

Known to be one of the worst child abuse cases in Singapore, the case made headlines and the boy's parents gained notoriety for severely abusing their son, who was said to be kept in a cat cage in their Toa Payoh home. Subsequently, in 2020, the murder charges were reduced to voluntarily causing grievous harm and the couple were sentenced to 27 years in jail each for the offences, with Ridzuan receiving 24 strokes of the cane and Azlin to serve an additional year in prison in lieu of caning. Upon the prosecution's appeal however, Azlin was convicted of murder while Ridzuan's sentence was increased to life imprisonment in July 2022. Three months later, Azlin was sentenced to life imprisonment by the Court of Appeal on 18 October 2022, despite the prosecution's urgings for the death penalty on Azlin.

== The boy's abuse and death ==
Born in January 2011 to Ridzuan bin Mega Abdul Rahman and Azlin binte Arujunah, the boy, who was the youngest of the couple's six children, was adopted by Azlin's close friend Zufarina bte Abdul Hamid in March 2011 because the couple were unable to take care of him given their unemployment. The boy's name was not revealed due to his age and to protect the identity of his siblings.

For the next four years, Zufarina deeply cared for the boy, treating him like a son and the boy also regarded her as a mother. It was in May 2015 when the boy was returned to his parents, after Zufarina was unable to make childcare and schooling arrangements for the boy near her home, given there was no parental consent. The boy then lived in his parents' Toa Payoh rental flat with not just his parents, but three of his siblings – an older brother and two older sisters. While the abuse did not start immediately after the boy returned to his biological family, it began only thirteen months later in June 2016.

The abuse was carried out in various ways, mostly physically and psychologically. The ill-treatment of the child by both Ridzuan and Azlin was revealed in some details. Often, the couple would hit him with a broom or hanger, or with their bare hands. They also used pliers to pinch him on the thighs and buttocks. The most notable abusive practice was the couple frequently locking the boy inside a small cat cage meant for the family's pet cat.

Sometime in August 2016, Azlin used a broom to whack her son after suspecting that the boy had toppled a biscuit tin, which spilled the biscuits on the kitchen floor. Her beating left marks on his stomach and caused the boy to develop a limp and a misaligned kneecap. Ridzuan, on another occasion, allegedly used a lit cigarette to scatter hot burning ash onto his son's arms when he refused to answer him, and he also used a heated spoon to burn the child's palm to punish the boy for stealing milk powder to eat.

=== Death ===
In mid and late-October 2016, the boy was subjected to four incidents of abuse by scalding. The incidents would culminate in the boy's death on 22 October 2016.

Between 15 and 17 October 2016, Azlin allegedly grabbed the boy by his ankle to prevent him from running away, then poured boiling hot water over both his right leg and hand, and over his arm and chest. As a result, he was limping and in pain, and sustained both blisters and peeling skin in the burned areas. On another occasion, Azlin once again splashed hot water on him, and the boy, in a moment of anger, shouted at his mother in Malay, "kau gila ke apa?", which means "are you crazy or what?". The boy's outburst only provoked the couple into throwing more cups of boiling water onto the boy.

At around noon on 22 October 2016, both Azlin and Ridzuan initiated their fourth and final scalding incident. At that time, the boy, who was confined in the cat cage, was asked out for a bath by his mother but he refused to remove his shorts, hence she woke her husband up to punish the boy. First, Ridzuan hit the boy on his head, hands and legs with a broom, but the boy continued to refuse to remove his shorts. For this, Ridzuan took several cups of hot water and threw them at the boy, despite the child's pleas in Malay to not get scalded. After the scalding, the boy crouched down in the toilet, and Ridzuan continued to pour hot water over his back and calf before stopping.

After this, the boy fell forward onto the bathroom floor and stopped moving, having lost consciousness. This time, the scalding proved fatal. The boy was left on the toilet floor for six hours before his parents finally took him to hospital. The boy was pronounced dead a day later in KK Women's and Children's Hospital from his scald injuries.

== Perpetrators ==
=== Ridzuan bin Mega Abdul Rahman ===
Ridzuan bin Mega Abdul Rahman
- Born: Between May and July 1992; Singapore
- Status: Imprisoned at Changi Prison since October 2016
- Convictions: Voluntarily causing grievous hurt by dangerous means (4 counts) various charges of child abuse
- Penalty: Life imprisonment
- Accomplice: Azlin binte Arujunah (wife)

Details
- Victims: 1
- Date: July to October 2016
- Country: Singapore
- Date apprehended: 26 October 2016

Ridzuan bin Mega Abdul Rahman, the younger of two children and the only son of his family, was born in Singapore in 1992, sometime between May and July. He has an elder sister Norhafizah, who was eight years his senior.

According to news reports and testimonies of Ridzuan and his family, Ridzuan came from a dysfunctional family background. While nothing is known about his father, Ridzuan grew up without his mother, who often faced legal problems with the authorities for drug related offences, and instead, his maternal aunt Kasmah binte Latiff would be the one to care for him. Ridzuan was only together with his sister for the first two years of his life; both siblings lived apart from each other for the next fourteen years. Still, Ridzuan was the favourite grandchild of his grandmother, who reportedly pampered him and would give him anything he needed.

In his childhood, Ridzuan was said to be a difficult child to raise and understand. His grandmother considered him crazy and his uncles felt he was difficult to understand due to him being quick in his speech and his sentences did not flow. Ridzuan also did not perform well in school, as he often failed his subjects in his primary school. Often, he was said to be glad when he got zero for his tests and exams. The absence of his mother and the lack of supervision from his grandmother may have contributed to his low academic performance in school.

Ridzuan, who was sorted into the EM3 stream as a result of his grades, also did not have initiative to manage his school work and expected his aunt to do it for him. He even skipped classes and school and went out to play, and he always would use his stationery to abuse his aunt if she did not help him do his homework. When he grew older, if his aunt refused him money, Ridzuan would hit her, punch the wall, raise his voice or throw things. Ridzuan was also said to have low intellect, and was addicted to drugs during his teenage years. He even spent time in a boys' home until his release at age 16. He went to live with his sister afterwards, thus reuniting with her for the first time, and lived with their stepfather, mother, and his sister's five children. Later, the family took Azlin in and their expenses were handled by Ridzuan's sister since they were both underage.

During the two to three years he spent in his sister's home, Ridzuan continued to display an ill-temper. Twice, he had flared up and assaulted his sister's two ex-boyfriends when he intervened during arguments between them and his sister. He tried to attack a man at a hawker centre for accidentally bumping into his shoulder. He also assaulted his mother's friend in the eye until it bled due to the friend causing his mother to go to jail.

The worst of these ill-tempered moments were when Ridzuan, who by then was married to Azlin, actually strangled his sister Norhafizah when she accidentally kicked her foot at the then pregnant Azlin. Norhafizah was also four to five months pregnant during the strangling incident. He himself also kicked Azlin's pregnant belly at a moment of anger during his marriage and abuse of Azlin. Despite these flaws, Ridzuan did not go as far as venting his anger on his nephews and nieces. He was also unfaithful to his wife at one point as he engaged in an affair with another woman. Due to Norhafizah being unable to get along with Azlin, the couple moved out and rented a one-room flat in Toa Payoh.

Up until his arrest, Ridzuan made a living by selling various items on an e-marketplace known as Carousell, which included amulets, "love potions" and old currencies; other than that, he and Azlin relied on financial assistance schemes by the government to sustain their living.

=== Azlin binte Arujunah ===
Azlin binte Arujunah
- Born: c. April 1992; Singapore
- Status: Imprisoned since October 2016
- Conviction: Murder
- Penalty: Life imprisonment
- Accomplice: Ridzuan bin Mega Abdul Rahman (husband)

Details
- Victims: 1
- Date: July to October 2016
- Country: Singapore
- Date apprehended: 27 October 2016

Azlin binte Arujunah, a Singaporean born in April 1992, was the wife of Ridzuan. Azlin did not have a happy childhood and was abused by her parents. Her father was a drug addict and had spent time in prison, and her mother neglected her, which led to Azlin leaving her parents at age 4 or 5 to live with her grandparents. Her paternal uncle and aunt both took care of her, and Azlin shared a close bond with her grandmother, who was the only one who showed her compassion and love. It can be presumed that she became addicted to drug abuse during her teenage years. Other details of her life were not covered in specific, thorough detail like her husband.

During her young adulthood, Azlin met Ridzuan, who was the same age as her, and they lived together in Norhafizah's flat after Ridzuan was released from the boys' home. Azlin then became married to Ridzuan during the period, and Azlin was a victim of spousal abuse by Ridzuan, as well as her husband's unfaithfulness. She also continued to abuse methamphetamine during her marriage. Her grandmother died in March 2016, and it affected her; the death of her mother, with whom she just reconciled, in June 2016 aggravated her depressed mood.

After she gave birth to her youngest son, Azlin entrusted the child to the care of her close friend Zufarina Abdul Hamid, who would take care of the child for four years before returning him to Azlin, which led to the child's abuse and death.

== Murder trial and sentencing ==
=== Arrest and proceedings ===
The case was subsequently reported to the police by the hospital authorities. Ridzuan bin Mega Abdul Rahman was first arrested on 26 October 2016, and charged with voluntarily causing grievous hurt by using hot water to scald the boy. His wife, Azlin binte Arujunah, was later arrested and charged with murder the following day. If found guilty under Singapore law, Azlin would be sentenced to death (if the murder was of first degree), or alternatively to the minimum punishment of life imprisonment (if it was of second, third or fourth degree). Subsequently, Ridzuan's charge was increased to murder, and he thus also potentially faced the death penalty; he was also liable to caning up to 24 strokes should he be sentenced to life instead of death since he was male unlike Azlin.

On 12 November 2019, both Azlin and Ridzuan stood trial in the High Court of Singapore before judge Valerie Thean (daughter of retired judge Thean Lip Ping; also known as L P Thean) for the murder of their son. Azlin was represented by a team of three lawyers Thangavelu, Terence Tan and Cheryl Ng, while Ridzuan was represented by leading criminal lawyer Eugene Thuraisingam, and two others: Syazana Yahya and Haziq Ika. Deputy Public Prosecutor (DPP) Tan Wen Hsien, together with two other colleagues, Li Yihong and Daphne Tan, were in charge of prosecution the couple for third-degree murder, which meant murder by intentionally inflicting injuries that were sufficient to cause a person's death.

=== Cause of death ===
In the first few days of the trial in November 2019, the pathologist and other medical experts gave evidence regarding the cause of death and severity of the burns found on the boy. Dr Chan Shi Jia, a forensic pathologist from the Health Sciences Authority who conducted an autopsy on the boy, testified that the cause of death mainly arose from the scald injuries caused on the boy. Dr Chan said in her testimony that there were partial thickness scald burns that covered nearly 75% of the boy's body. These burns are also known as second degree burns, and they tend to be more painful than "full thickness" burns (or third degree burns) as the injuries can extend to and reach the blood vessels, causing bleeding. Also, since a large part of the skin, which served as the body's protective layer, was missing, it can cause infection to set in and the boy died from multiple organ failure due to the infection.

Besides, Dr Gavin Kang Chun Wui, the burns specialist who took the stand after Dr Chan, stated that the boy's condition would not have deteriorated if he was given medical attention earlier. Dr Kang stated that when he treated the boy in the hospital, he observed the boy as critically ill, and the burns seemed to appear dirty and had a lot of black debris, which implied that the patient had not received immediate cleaning or medical attention after the injuries were sustained. He testified that it was life-threatening should one's body be covered with burns by more than 40% to 50%, and a child would sustain more serious burn injuries than an adult due to them having thinner, delicate skin. However, Dr Kang said it was hard to infer if the burns on the boy were the result of either a single scald attempt or multiple scald attempts. Based on the raw state of the boy's skin, he said the scald injuries were possibly caused within a week of his hospitalisation.

Not only that, when the cat cage where the boy was locked in was tested, Dr Chan said that the cage measured 91 cm long, 58 cm wide and 70 cm tall, and the boy's height was only 105 cm tall. The metallic bars have caused lacerations on the boy who could have moved about in the cage, and these injuries were found on his face and scalp. There was underlying, yet substantial bleeding underneath the boy's scalp, which covered the length and width of the boy's entire head, and the lot of dark red and brown blood clots discovered on these areas were due to blunt force trauma, which also contributed to the boy's death.

During the cross-examination of the medical experts, the defence lawyers sought to cast doubts that their clients caused the fatal injury. Azlin's defence counsel questioned Dr Chan if the boy would be able to run around the living room had the earlier scald injuries been severe. Dr Chan replied that the boy was running "for his life" and it was common sense that people would run after being stabbed. Ridzuan's lawyer, Mr Eugene Thuraisingam, noted that there were four incidents of scalding, and he contended that it was not possible to tell which injury was the fatal one. Thuraisingam also suggested to Dr Chan that the boy had pneumonia, which might have increased his risk of mortality. For this, when questioned by DPP Tan, Dr Chan testified that after she examined the victim's lungs, there were indeed signs of pneumonia, but the traces were minimal and patchy, and could not have contributed to his death.

Initially, both parents said that the boy accidentally scalded himself with hot water, and they denied involvement in his death. In their prior police statements, both the couple stated they did not intend to kill the boy, and only wanted to punish him whenever the boy allegedly gave them disobedient behaviours and attitudes. Azlin, in particular, stated that she could not have killed her own child given her small body, and she said she loved her children, and she would have killed them if she really killed her son. She also argued that she never knew that her actions of scalding her son would kill him. Despite admitting their police statements in court, both Azlin and Ridzuan elected to not give any testimony in their defence; instead, the defence psychiatric experts were summoned to support the couple's defences of diminished responsibility.

=== Psychiatric evidence ===
Ridzuan's defence psychiatrist Dr Ken Ung Eng Khean testified that Ridzuan had attention deficit hyperactivity disorder (ADHD), intermittent explosive disorder (IED), and hypnotic use disorder, a condition associated with repeated use of sedative-like drugs. Dr Ung opined that Ridzuan was experiencing an abnormality of the mind as these psychiatric disorders, which originated from his childhood, affected his mental faculties. Azlin's defence psychiatrist Dr Jacob Rajesh also said that Azlin had an adjustment disorder with a depressed mood that impaired her mental responsibility at the time, and the condition stemmed from her personal difficulties, abusive marriage, as well as the grief she sustained from the deaths of her grandmother and mother, which also spurred her to abuse methamphetamine.

In response, the prosecution called on several government psychiatrists who refuted the facts that the couple had diminished responsibility; instead, they described the couple to be of sound mind despite their supposed symptoms of psychiatric conditions. Firstly, for Ridzuan, Dr Cheow Enquan of the Institute of Mental Health (IMH) testified that the abuse Ridzuan directed at his son was a calculated, escalated pattern of violence, as he was shown to have increased his severity of the punishments and resorted to more drastic means to discipline the boy for his alleged persistent bad behaviour, which included the theft of his siblings' milk powder; Ridzuan also admitted to punishing his other children but not as severe compared to the deceased boy's case.

For this, Dr Cheow said it was inconsistent with the behaviour of someone who had IED, and he still had control over his aggression. If he indeed had this condition, he would have been indiscriminately violent and abusive to his other children regardless of whether they behaved well or not. As for the other disorders which Ridzuan allegedly had, Dr Cheow said he disagreed with Dr Ung's diagnosis that Ridzuan had ADHD and hypnotic use disorder; he did however, accept the defence's contention that Ridzuan's behaviour did show symptoms of anti-social personality disorder but he said it was not enough to make a formal substantial diagnosis. Furthermore, there was no impairment of Ridzuan's mind by the disorder at the time of the offences, even if taking into consideration his misbehaviours during his youth. A clinical psychologist, Dr Leung Hoi Ting found that Ridzuan's low IQ did not make him have low adaptive functioning since he was able to perform daily tasks on his own and it was rather his personal preference to rely on others to do it for him. Like Dr Cheow, Dr Leung disagreed that Ridzuan had ADHD and while on the stand, she was told off by Thuraisingam for not making a clearer observation and assessment of his client, since she did not speak to Ridzuan's mother (who was in prison) or grandmother to inquire about Ridzuan's condition.

Meanwhile, when turning attention to Azlin's condition, the prosecution's assigned psychiatrists agreed that she had an adjustment disorder. However, Dr Kenneth Koh and Dr Jaydip Sarkar disagreed that it impaired her mental faculties at the time she abused and killed her son. Dr Koh, who was the only one of the two to testify in the trial since Dr Sarkar was overseas at the time, said that she could perform her daily tasks normally and control herself from being abusive towards her other children. Her punishments were not spontaneous or out of impulse, but rather complex, and she understood the magnitude of her actions, as well as differentiating right from wrong. When Azlin's lawyer Thangavelu asked about the significance of Azlin's stressors, Dr Koh conceded their severity, and admitted under Thangavelu's questioning that he did not have access to Azlin's police statements. He was told off by Thangavelu for not understanding his client's condition since he did not have a longer assessment of Azlin like Dr Sarkar and Dr Rajesh.

=== Reduction of murder charges ===
On 3 April 2020, in midst of the trial, Justice Valerie Thean found that the prosecution had insufficient evidence to specifically prove the alleged common intention by the couple to inflict on their son injuries that were sufficient in the ordinary cause of nature to cause death, which is an essential element to prove the mens rea of the murder charges proceeded against Azlin and Ridzuan. Hence, she decided to acquit the couple of murder and asked the prosecution to file alternative charges in relation to the fatal scalding incidents undergone by the boy. In light of the judge's decision to dismiss the murder charges, the prosecution decided to bring up fresh charges of voluntarily causing grievous hurt by dangerous means, for which the crime warrants the maximum penalty of life imprisonment, or alternatively up to 15 years' imprisonment, in addition to a fine or caning up to 24 lashes. The defence tried to object to the fresh charges but Justice Thean approved the charges and convicted the couple accordingly. The couple additionally pleaded guilty to the other charges of child abuse and hurt, which came under the Children and Young Persons Act (CYPA).

The prosecution thus, in accordance to the most serious conviction, sought the maximum term of life imprisonment for both Ridzuan and Azlin, describing the case so aggravating that it was one of Singapore's worst cases of child abuse resulting in death. Despite weighing much of their arguments on life imprisonment, the prosecution also asked the judge to alternatively, if she found a life sentence too excessive, sentence Azlin to serve a term of 27 years in prison and also to add one more year worth of imprisonment in lieu of caning while asking for Ridzuan to receive 24 years with 24 strokes of the cane as they stated Azlin played a more culpable, larger role than Ridzuan in scalding the boy to the point of grievous injury and death. As for Ridzuan's lawyer Eugene Thuraisingam, he asked for his client to receive 15 years' and five months' imprisonment and 12 strokes of the cane since he indeed played a smaller role than Azlin and had faced several life difficulties that spurred him into committing the offences, while Azlin's lawyer Thangavelu argued for at least 16 years' imprisonment in view of the sympathetic circumstances of her life, marriage and background.

=== Sentence ===
On 13 July 2020, High Court Justice Valerie Thean made her final judgement on sentence. 28-year-old Azlin binte Arujunah was sentenced to a total of 28 years' imprisonment, while 28-year-old Ridzuan bin Mega Abdul Rahman was sentenced to 27 years' imprisonment and the maximum caning sentence of 24 strokes of the cane.

Justice Thean found that life imprisonment was not appropriate because the medical evidence could not determine which injuries arose from which incidents, and that despite not qualifying for diminished responsibility, Azlin's adjustment disorder and Ridzuan's low IQ prevented them from realising the full consequences of their actions. She also considered that Azlin should not deserve a heavier sentence than Ridzuan as there was a common, joint responsibility that the couple shared with each other equally in inflicting the child abuse. Besides, Ridzuan was the one who introduced the concept of domestic abuse to Azlin through their abusive marriage, and it was also Ridzuan who first started the violence against the child in July 2016, by using pliers to pinch the child. Being a male and having a stronger physical condition, Ridzuan caused greater harm to the boy in the abuse, so much so that for instance, when he punched the boy on one occasion, causing the boy to have a nose fracture.

Also, both Azlin and Ridzuan made the joint decision to not send the boy to hospital for medical treatment immediately. Hence, both of them should receive equal punishment for what they committed. Other than that, the judge also made note of the seriousness of the couple's crimes, stating that their arguments to downplay their culpability with their domestic and financial difficulties were a mockery of the facts. She also criticised the couple in her judgement for putting their self-interests as their priority compared to the welfare of the boy, and it was demonstrated when they never gave consent to Zufarina's decision to send the boy to a nearby kindergarten, and they also never sent him to preschool after he was returned to them.

Due to this, for the most serious charges of voluntarily causing hurt with dangerous means, Justice Thean imposed on Azlin and Ridzuan a term ranging between 12 and 14 years' imprisonment; and for each of the various other charges of child abuse and hurt faced the couple separately, the judge gave out jail terms ranging between six months and one year for Ridzuan and between six months and eight years for Azlin. Three out of these jail terms for Ridzuan and Azlin each were ordered to run consecutively. Accordingly, Ridzuan and Azlin were each sentenced to a total of 27 years' imprisonment. In addition, Ridzuan was sentenced to the legal maximum of 24 strokes of the cane, while Azlin, who cannot be caned under the law due to her gender, had 12 more months (or a year) added to her 27-year sentence, which became a term of 28 years' jail.

By then, the prosecution had appealed against the couple's acquittal for murder; they also decided to include fresh arguments for life imprisonment in their appeal should their appellate challenge against the couple's convictions was not accepted. However, in February 2021, the prosecution decided to not pursue the original murder charge in Ridzuan's case after reconsidering his involvement in the crime, and hence they withdrew their appeal against Ridzuan's acquittal.

== Prosecution's appeal ==
=== Case hearing ===
On 7 September 2021, the prosecution's appeal was heard in the Court of Appeal of Singapore, and a five-judge panel led by Chief Justice Sundaresh Menon was set to hear the arguments from the prosecution and defence. Senior Counsel Goh Yihan, dean of the Singapore Management University's Yong Pung How School of Law, and DPP Mohamed Faizal bin Mohamed Abdul Kadir (who prosecuted convicted maid abuser Gaiyathiri Murugayan for abusing and killing her maid) also joined the prosecution (completely replaced by Senthilkumaran Sabapathy and Norine Tan) to argue on their behalf.

The prosecution argued that Azlin should be convicted of murder. They said that Azlin was the director of the four scalding attacks on the boy and she acted in line with Ridzuan to cause the burns on their son, given she scalded the boy in the first three attempts and egged on her husband to do the fourth scalding, for which the injuries were sufficient to cause death. Even if it was not murder, the actions of both Azlin and Ridzuan were so abhorrent, cruel and inhumane that it should be considered as a suitable case for life imprisonment. They did not accept that life imprisonment was not warranted in their case based on Azlin's adjustment disorder and Ridzuan's low IQ. They also argued that the boy had experienced extensive suffering from the burns that lasted during the final days of his life and up until his death. The prosecution commented that if such a cruel conduct did not warrant life imprisonment, it would have been hard to understand the true criteria for life imprisonment in cases relating to grievous hurt.

In response, Eugene Thuraisingam (Ridzuan's lawyer) and Cheryl Ng (Azlin's lawyer) argued that the sentences were appropriate in the couple's cases, given that the couple lacked the understanding that their actions would result in severe consequences and death. Ng added that should Azlin fully intended to cause death when inflicting the scald injuries, she would definitely deserve life imprisonment, but the evidence proved otherwise. Thuraisingam commented that Ridzuan showed remorse and admitted his responsibility from the start, and his young age should be a mitigating factor in his sentence. The Court of Appeal reserved its decision after hearing the submissions.

=== Judgement and Ridzuan's final sentence ===
Ten months later, on 12 July 2022, the Court of Appeal decided to allow the prosecution's appeal, therefore finding 30-year-old Azlin binte Arujunah guilty of murder while they increased 30-year-old Ridzuan bin Mega Abdul Rahman's original 27-year sentence to life imprisonment.

Turning to Ridzuan's case, the five judges - Chief Justice Sundaresh Menon and four Judges of Appeal Judith Prakash, Tay Yong Kwang, Andrew Phang and Steven Chong - were of the opinion that the original trial judge Valerie Thean did not adequately consider the aggravating factors of the case before deciding on Ridzuan's original sentence. They found that among all the aggravating circumstances, Ridzuan had abused his son, who was a defenceless five-year-old boy, in a particularly cruel and inhumane manner over a prolonged period of time and the child was burnt extensively over his entire body, including his face and genital area. The subsequent scalding incidents were also committed despite the boy's vulnerable condition and they worsened the existing injuries on his body, and Ridzuan allowed the abuse to continue on, for which his willful blindness led to the boy's eventual death. Through these above actions, Ridzuan had clearly betrayed the trust and confidence accorded to him as a parent by abusing his own child. The five judges were thus satisfied that there were no mitigating factors in Ridzuan's case, which they determined as one of the worst type of hurt-related cases that deserves the maximum penalty of life imprisonment under the law.

Turning to Azlin's case, the Court of Appeal found that Azlin had intentionally caused the four scalding incidents on her son, as demonstrated by her personally carrying out the scalding for the first three occasions (one of them with Ridzuan) and instigating her husband to do the fourth and final scalding, and never intervened during the fourth incident. Since the scald injuries were intentionally inflicted primarily by Azlin, and these injuries were, in the ordinary cause of nature, sufficient to cause death, Azlin was considered guilty of murder under the law. Hence, Azlin's 28-year sentence was revoked and her convictions of causing grievous hurt were amended to murder.

In their written judgement, the five appellate judges also expanded the scope of how the legal element of common intention should be interpreted. They highlighted the "relatively novel scenario" that the boy's abuse case presented, in which the scenario depicts a variety of acts being committed by multiple offenders, and each act can be viewed as a distinct offence because the offenders' intentions for carrying out the acts may be different even though they might have collectively intend to commit some of these acts. The judges ultimately found that liability for individual acts committed by another person can be attributed to the offender, in order to form a "larger" criminal act that serves as the basis for the offence. It was reported that Azlin shed tears as she heard the court convicting her of murder.

However, sentencing was reserved due to the court needing time to hear submissions on Azlin's final sentence, and it was likely that Azlin would either be sentenced to death or life imprisonment. Additionally, the caning sentence of Ridzuan was temporarily suspended as the judges required time to hear submissions on whether Ridzuan should get 24 strokes of the cane or not.

=== Azlin's final sentence ===
On 18 October 2022, despite the prosecution's arguments for the death penalty, 30-year-old Azlin Arujunah was sentenced to life imprisonment.

The Court of Appeal found that despite Azlin's inhumane conduct and cruelty against her son, she was not likely to have the consciousness that the scald injuries would eventually lead to her son's death, and she and her husband both had applied ointment before the boy's condition became severe and eventually fatal. They also agreed with the trial judge that Azlin inherited the abusive behaviour from her husband, who was responsible for most of the abuse despite his lower culpability in the fatal scalding incidents.

The Court of Appeal made these above findings based on references to the landmark case of Kho Jabing, a Malaysian who was hanged in 2016 for the robbery-murder of Cao Ruyin, and they emphasised that based on Kho's case, the death penalty should only be reserved for the cases that demonstrated exceptional cruelty and a blatant disregard for human life, and also sparked an outrage of the feelings of the community. However, they felt that Azlin's disregard for her son's life and cruelty was not sufficiently at the same level as Kho's case to warrant the death penalty despite their agreement that any reasonable member of the public would show outrage over the violence and brutality behind the case, and the court "should not be distracted by the gruesomeness of the scene of the crime" despite the extent of cruelty and violence of the case being a relevant factor in sentencing.

The five-judge panel, having referred to the principle of parity, decided to also not impose caning on Ridzuan given that it was disproportionate to allow Ridzuan to get a heavier sentence of life with caning for the lower offence of causing hurt than Azlin, who got life with no caning for the harshest offence of murder, and it would double-count certain factors (already considered before deciding the jail term) if caning was to be imposed, and thus they rejected the prosecution's arguments for an additional 12 strokes of the cane in Ridzuan's case.

== Case response and effect ==
In April 2023, when investigating officer Mahathir Mohamad was interviewed, he stated that of all the murder cases he investigated throughout his ten years of service in the police, the five-year-old boy's murder was by far the most harrowing murder he ever solved. Mahathir stated that ever since the end of the appeal process, he felt that justice had been served for the little boy and the parents were given their due punishments for the child's murder.

In 2023, Singaporean Tamil-language crime show Theerpugal (translated as "The Verdict" in Tamil) re-enacted the five-year-old boy's abuse and murder.

In 2025, after the High Court sentencing of Megan Khung's mother and her boyfriend for her abuse and death, the 2016 Toa Payoh child abuse case was classified as one of at least eight most high-profile cases of child abuse resulting in death that happened in Singapore between 2015 and 2023.

== See also ==
- Capital punishment in Singapore
- Caning in Singapore
- List of major crimes in Singapore
- Life imprisonment in Singapore
- Death of Annie Ee
- Child abuse
- Kho Jabing
- Yishun infant murder
- List of cases affected by the Kho Jabing case
