= Yellow Ribbon Singapore =

Agency overview
- Formed: 1 April 1976; 50 years ago (as the Singapore Corporation of Rehabilitative Enterprises); 1 May 2020; 6 years ago (as Yellow Ribbon Singapore)
- Jurisdiction: Government of Singapore
- Headquarters: 980 Upper Changi Road North Singapore 507708
- Minister responsible: K. Shanmugam, Minister for Home Affairs
- Agency executives: Phillip Tan, Chairman; Matthew Wee Yik Keong, CEO
- Parent agency: Ministry of Home Affairs
- Website: https://www.yellowribbon.gov.sg/
- Agency ID: T08GB0049F

Yellow Ribbon Singapore (YRSG), formerly the Singapore Corporation of Rehabilitative Enterprises (SCORE), is a statutory board under the Ministry of Home Affairs established on 1 April 1976.

It is part of the Singapore correctional system and is a strategic partner of the Singapore Prison Service. Yellow Ribbon Singapore is responsible for enhancing the employability of offenders and preparing them for their reintegration into the national workforce. Their services include training, work, employment assistance for offenders and community engagement.

== History ==
Yellow Ribbon's origins date back to 7 November 1975, when it was established under the provisions of the SCORE Act, as a statutory board to bring about the rehabilitation of offenders. It took over the functions of prison industries, which were then operating traditional services like book-binding, woodwork, cane work, tailoring and footwear manufacturing.

== Activities ==
Yellow Ribbon Singapore offers vocational training to offenders in various commercial services, including laundry and linen leasing, central kitchen operations, bakery services, food catering, subcontracting, industrial space leasing, and digital media. The revenue generated from these services is reinvested into funding rehabilitation programs for offenders, including training and employment assistance. The organization provides nationally accredited training that covers vocational skills as well as employability skills such as IT and job readiness preparation. Additionally, Yellow Ribbon Singapore operates an online job portal to help match offenders with potential employers from its job bank.

Yellow Ribbon Singapore is affiliated with the Community Action for the Rehabilitation of Ex-offenders (CARE) network. This network initiated the Yellow Ribbon Project in 2004 with the aim of increasing awareness about the reintegration needs of ex-offenders and their families.
