= Mohamed Faizal Mohamed Abdul Kadir =

Singaporean jurist

The Honourable Mohamed Faizal Mohamed Abdul Kadir SC

Judge of the High Court of Singapore
- Incumbent
- Assumed office 9 March 2026
- Appointed by: Tharman Shanmugaratnam

Judicial Commissioner of Singapore
- In office 2 May 2024 – 8 March 2026
- Appointed by: Halimah Yacob

Personal details
- Born: 1980 (age 45–46)
- Education: National University of Singapore Faculty of Law (LLB); Harvard Law School (LLM)

Mohamed Faizal Mohamed Abdul Kadir PPA SC (born 1980) is a Judge of the Supreme Court of Singapore.

== Education ==
Mohamed Faizal was educated in Bedok View Secondary School. He then graduated from the National University of Singapore Faculty of Law with a first class honours LLB in 2005. As a student there, he received numerous awards including the Kwa Geok Choo Scholarship, the CJ Koh Scholarship and the Shook Lin and Bok Award.

Mohamed Faizal subsequently received his LLM from Harvard Law School in 2009, which he attended on Kathryn Worth Foundation and Legal Service Commission scholarships. His thesis written at Harvard Law School was awarded the Gold Medal Prize by the International Insolvency Institute.

== Legal career ==
After graduation from the National University of Singapore Faculty of Law, Mohamed Faizal served as a Justices' Law Clerk and Assistant Registrar of the Supreme Court of Singapore. Mohamed Faizal then moved on to the Attorney-General's Chambers, where he eventually became Second Chief Prosecutor. He was also previously in the Singapore Medical Council.

One of the cases managed by Mohamed Faizal was the prosecution of Gaiyathiri Murugayan for the abuse and murder of her Myanmar maid Piang Ngaih Don, who died in July 2016. Gaiyathiri was initially charged with intentional murder before the charge was reduced to culpable homicide not amounting to murder due to her psychiatric disorders; she also faced more than a hundred charges of causing various degrees of hurt (ranging from hurt to grievous hurt) to the maid. Mohamed Faizal sought the maximum sentence of life imprisonment (or at least 27 years' jail) for Gaiyathiri, labelling her conduct as cruel and heinous, describing the case of Piang's death as a shocking case without parallel. Gaiyathiri was eventually sentenced to 30 years' imprisonment on 22 June 2021.

Mohamed Faizal was also involved in the appeal against the sentences of Azlin Arujunah and Ridzuan Mega Abdul Rahman for the 2016 fatal abuse and murder of their five-year-old son; the couple were earlier acquitted of murder and sentenced to 27 years in prison for child abuse and causing grievous hurt. Senior counsel Goh Yihan was appointed by the Court of Appeal as amicus curiae for the case. Mohamed Faizal successfully convinced the Court of Appeal to find Azlin guilty of murder and increase Ridzuan's sentence to life imprisonment on 12 July 2022. Although Mohamed Faizal argued for the death penalty, Azlin was sentenced to life imprisonment for her son's murder three months later by the Court of Appeal.

As a prosecutor, Mohamed Faizal has been described in Parliament as "an excellent example of how one mixes heavy duty responsibilities with regular volunteer work", and has elsewhere been described as one who "epitomises the fair approach" and is "a fair, honorable prosecutor."

In July 2023, Mohamed Faizal was appointed as Judicial Commissioner in the Supreme Court of Singapore, and started his two-year term on 2 May 2024. He was subsequently appointed as a Judge of the Supreme Court of Singapore on 9 March 2026.

Mohamed Faizal was also general editor of the Criminal Procedure Code of Singapore - Annotations and Commentary published in 2012.

== Professional appointments ==
Mohamed Faizal has sat, and sits, on the MUIS Appeal Board, the board of Advisory.SG, the Advisory Board of the Silent Heroes Awards, as Chairman of the Singapore Silent Heroes Student Award Committee, and also on the NUS Law Advisory Council. He was also on the Editorial Board of the New York International Law Review. Mohamed Faizal has also served on various committees such as the Committee for University Education Places 2015 and the Eldershield Review Committee.

Mohamed Faizal is a principal mediator with the Singapore Mediation Centre. He had held adjunct teaching positions in the National University of Singapore Faculty of Law and has also been involved in numerous training initiatives, including mediation and negotiation courses.

== Awards ==
Mohamed Faizal has received numerous awards and accolades for his work in government, public service, international conflict resolution and education, and it has been said that "his accomplishments are too numerous to be listed individually."

Mohamed Faizal received the Public Administration Medal (Bronze) in 2014. He has undertaken significant work in the area of international conflict resolution and in peace initiatives and was awarded the Association of Conflict Resolution's International Outstanding Leadership Award and the International Mediator of the Year Award. He was also awarded the President's Volunteerism & Philanthropy Award in 2015 by the President of Singapore for his work on developing scholarships for lower-income students, including at Bedok View Secondary and at Tampines Junior College. Mohamed Faizal also founded the Phoenix Grant at NUS Faculty of Law, the SLaw Daya Award at the Singapore University of Social Studies, the Raffles Prize and Phoenix Prize at Raffles Hall at the National University of Singapore, and the Health and Humanity Prize at the Yong Loo Lin School of Medicine. He further conceived, and funds, the KS Talent Development Award & Scholarship in Visual Arts at Association for Persons with Special Needs (APSN) Katong, a special-needs school in Singapore, that allows students in special education to develop their visual arts talent.

Mohamed Faizal has also received the Ten Outstanding Young Persons of the World Award and the Minister for Health Award for his contributions on the Eldershield Review Committee.

In 2016, Mohamed Faizal was appointed as a Young Global Leader by the World Economic Forum.

Mohamed Faizal is listed in The 500 Most Influential Muslims, an annual international publication, as one of the 500 Most Influential Muslims in the World.

Mohamed Faizal was appointed Senior Counsel in January 2020, the first Malay-Muslim in Singapore to be so appointed and becoming the youngest Senior Counsel to be appointed in the Legal Service. The appointment has been described as one "that shattered glass ceilings and inspired countless individuals in the Malay-Muslim community and beyond". He received the Berita Harian Achiever of the Year Award that same year for his achievements in the legal profession and his contributions to community causes.

== Personal life ==
Mohamed Faizal is married.
