= Inside Maximum Security =

Singaporean documentary series by CNA

- Inside Maximum Security
- Genre: Crime; Prison
- Starring: Khai; Boon Keng; Rusdi; Graceson; Iskandar
- Country of origin: Singapore
- Original language: English
- No. of seasons: 1
- No. of episodes: 4

Production
- Running time: approx. 45 minutes

Original release
- Network: CNA
- Release: 18 January – 6 February 2022

Inside Maximum Security is a Singaporean documentary series produced by CNA, which focuses on the lives of five inmates at B1 institution, the maximum-security section of Singapore's Changi Prison. The series, which consists of four episodes, aired between 16 January and 6 February 2022.

== Synopsis ==
Inside Maximum Security focuses on B1 institution, the maximum-security section of Changi Prison, where it imprisons some of Singapores most hardened criminals and those who committed violent crimes or serving long sentences. The series contains the interviews of five selected inmates, whose daily lives behind bars were also filmed and shown on camera. Several prison officers and some of the inmates' family members and friends were also featured in the interviews filed for the documentary series, and there were also explanation of prison rules and prison life made by the officers. Rehabilitation programmes and the yard time of inmates were also shown on-screen.

Inmates:

Khai (31)
An ex-skateboarder with a daughter. Muhammad Khairil bin Jasuri, better known as Khai for short, revealed that he caused hurt to his then-girlfriend in the midst of an argument, and was found guilty of voluntarily causing hurt, blackmail and extortion. He was serving two years and five months' imprisonment and two strokes of the cane since March 2020. This was his sixth incarceration so far, and his expected release date was in October 2022. He acts as a peer counsellor in prison.
Boon Keng (34)
A divorcee with a daughter. Tian Boon Keng was convicted of criminal breach of trust, breach of a personal protection order and drug consumption. He was serving three years and six months' imprisonment. This was his fourth incarceration so far, and his expected release date was in July 2022.
Rusdi (33)
A former personal trainer with a long-time girlfriend. Rusdi was caught trespassing at the Istana under the influence of drugs and thus charged with drug consumption and obstructing a public servant. He was serving three years and four months' imprisonment. This was his fourth incarceration so far, and he was released on 21 January 2022 at the end of the final episode.
Graceson (36)
A secret society member with a wife and three children, including his twelve-year-old eldest daughter. Ang Graceson was said to have carried three different weapons on three separate occasions. One of these incidents involved him wanting to slash a man to warn him to not mess with another person's wife. Graceson was charged with possession of weapons, criminal intimidation and drug consumption. He was serving six years and five months' imprisonment and 21 strokes of the cane. This was his fourth incarceration so far, and his expected release date was in November 2022.
Iskandar (41)
A convicted drug trafficker who has a sister and mother. Mohammed Iskandar bin Hameed Sultan initially faced the death penalty after his arrest in April 2012 for trafficking 35.31g of diamorphine. After a 17-day trial that took place between January 2015 and June 2018, Iskandar's charge was reduced to a non-capital one due to a plea bargain, and for both the reduced charge and another charge of drug consumption, Iskandar was serving 25 years' imprisonment and 15 strokes of the cane. This was his fifth incarceration so far, and his expected release date was in December 2028. He was enrolled in the prison school, where he attend classes to re-take his O-levels and intends to study for both a diploma and university degree.

== Episodes ==
- EP1: Inside Maximum Security - S1E1: Life In Lockdown
- EP2: Inside Maximum Security - S1E2: Keeping Bonds Beyond Bars
- EP3: Inside Maximum Security - S1E3: Breaking Bad Habits
- EP4: Inside Maximum Security - S1E4: Road To Freedom

== Production ==
CNA produced the series, and the filming took place at Changi Prison over a four-month period between October 2021 and January 2022. Before that, the production team pre-interviewed 22 inmates who volunteered to take part, with a majority of them hoping to make use of the filming project to remind themselves to not re-offend and come back to prison again. In the end, five inmates - Khai, Boon Keng, Rusdi, Graceson and Iskandar - were selected for the interviews and filming of their lives behind bars.

== Streaming ==
The series is currently available for streaming on YouTube, Netflix, Discovery Asia and meWATCH.

== Reception ==
Inside Maximum Security was positively received by the general public. However, there were also criticisms aimed at some of the unfavourable prison living conditions, including the absence of beds and electric fans inside the cells, which the Law Minister K. Shanmugam responded that beds in prison cells pose a hygiene issue and security risk and may add to contraband smuggling in jail, though beds can still be given to elderly prisoners and those who had medical conditions. He also responded that adding the fans in cells might also lead to inmates possibly hanging themselves.

On 23 June 2022, the series received the award for Best Documentary (human relations and values) at the World Media Festivals 2022.

== Beyond Maximum Security ==
A three-part sequel documentary series, Beyond Maximum Security, followed Khai, Boon Keng, Graceson, and Iskandar, for nearly a year after the original documentary aired. This sequel series premiered on 20 December 2022, and was broadcast on CNA and also released on YouTube.

== See also ==
- Changi Prison
- Singapore Prison Service
- Capital punishment in Singapore
