= Killing of Muawanatul Chasanah =

Abuse and killing of an Indonesian maid in Singapore

Muawanatul Chasanah
- Born: 1982; Indonesia
- Died: 2 December 2001 (aged 19); Bedok Reservoir, Singapore
- Cause of death: Peritonitis due to ruptured stomach
- Occupation: Domestic worker
- Employer(s): Ng Hua Chye, Tan Chai Hong
- Known for: Victim of an abuse and murder case

On 2 December 2001, a 19-year-old Indonesian maid, Muawanatul Chasanah, was found beaten to death in a house by the Bedok Reservoir, Singapore.

Her killer was Ng Hua Chye, a tour guide and Chasanah's employer. Ng's wife, Tan Chai Hong, was also discovered to be involved. Both were arrested and charged in connection to the maid's death. Ng was eventually sentenced to 18 years and six months' imprisonment with 12 strokes of the cane for culpable homicide, while Ng's wife, who did not take part in the killing, was given a jail term of nine months for maid abuse and failing to make a police report on her husband's offences.

== Employment ==
In 2000, Chasanah, then 17 years old, travelled from Indonesia to Singapore to work as a maid. After she arrived in Singapore, she was employed by 47-year-old Ng Hua Chye and his wife, 30-year-old Tan Chai Hong (also known as Rainbow Tan), who had a daughter and son. Her first day of work began on 3 August 2000.

== Abuse and subsequent death ==
During her 9-month employment, Chasanah was subjected to a series of abuses by Ng and Tan. This occurred at both Ng and his sister's houses. Each time she displeased Ng, he would repeatedly punch her, beat her with both a cane and a hammer, dump boiling water on her, or burn her with the ends of cigarettes. In one instance, after she drank his infant daughter's apple juice, Ng caned her until her face swelled up.

Aside from physical abuse, she was also starved, most of her meals consisting of packets of instant noodles. When she began her job, she weighed 50 kg. On the day of her death, her weight had already dropped to 36 kg.

Ng was also highly suspicious of Chasanah, claiming she wanted to "slip powders, herbs, and papers with Arabic writings" into the family's meals. He believed that this would make the family "obey her".

In November 2001, Tan Chai Hong grabbed Chasanah's breasts after she failed to properly bathe her daughter.

=== Death ===
On 1 December 2001, Chasanah was working in the home of Ng's sister. Ng accused the maid of stealing leftover porridge from his young daughter, later stating she was going to use the food to "cast a spell". He punched her in the face, then kicked her in the stomach so hard that it ruptured. She vomited and fainted in the kitchen, afflicted by severe stomach pain.

The following day, Ng stepped into the local police station, confessing to severely abusing her and kicking her in the stomach the previous day; he also expressed his fear that she may die. Paramedics were dispatched to Ng's flat, where they pronounced Chasanah dead on the scene. She was found in a vomit-stained T-shirt and had a distended stomach. The autopsy reported that her body was covered in sores from what appeared to be an attack with the back of a hammer. Both her back and her neck were discoloured from an apparent scalding. An autopsy report revealed that the maid had over 200 scars on her body. Her cause of death was determined to be peritonitis that developed when her stomach ruptured.

== Arrest and sentencing of Ng and Tan ==
After the discovery of Chasanah's body, Ng, who surrendered himself at a police station, was arrested immediately. Originally charged with murder and facing the death penalty, he pled guilty to a reduced charge of culpable homicide, after his lawyer Subhas Anandan made a plea bargain with the prosecution to reduce the murder charge since he voluntarily surrendered himself to the police before they arrested him. Ng also pleaded guilty to four out of seven charges of voluntarily causing hurt to the maid. The maximum penalty for manslaughter in Singapore was life imprisonment.

On 19 July 2002, Judicial Commissioner Choo Han Teck sentenced him to ten years in prison and ordered him to be caned six times for killing Chasanah. For the four maid abuse charges he was convicted of, he received an additional eight years and six months in prison and another six strokes of the cane, making it a total of 18 1/2 years imprisonment with 12 strokes of the cane. His sentence was the highest a maid abuser had received up to that point.

Tan Chai Hong was also arrested. On 19 February 2003, magistrate Alvin Koh sentenced her to nine months’ prison time for grabbing and squeezing the maid's breasts. He considered adding a charge for not reporting her husband to the police, but decided against it. While sentencing Tan, Koh remarked about the former offence: "this vicious attack which you inflicted on her breasts revealed your latent disregard for her dignity as a human being and as a woman." However, Tan was granted a bail of S$5000 (US$3,706) and was subsequently released after paying the money.

== Reactions ==
=== Government response ===
Following Chasanah's death, the Indonesian government froze new foreign domestic worker contracts for a month in order to review the system.

=== Public response ===
A neighbour of Ng, a man named Mr Neo, commented on Chasanah's abuse and death, stating: "Even if I knew, I wouldn’t have called the police, it’s not my business. He can do what he wants, that’s his problem." In November 2002, this remark caused a group of Singaporeans to form an advocacy group called Transient Workers Count Too (TWC2), hoping to prevent any more acts of abuse against foreign domestic workers.

In addition, Singaporean authorities believe that the publicity surrounding her death has assisted in reducing the number of reported maid abuse cases from 157 in 1997 to 43 in 2002. The case was also re-enacted by Mediacorp's crime show True Files in 2003.

Ng's lawyer Subhas Anandan also wrote about the case in his memoir. He said he was personally feeling repulsed at the extent of abuse suffered by the victim but he had to suppress his disgust to maintain a professional mind while managing his client's case. He also wondered how Ng, a father who dearly loved his children, could behave in such a barbaric way towards someone else's beloved daughter.

The case was recalled nearly twenty years later when another convicted maid abuser Gaiyathiri Murugayan, who murdered her Burmese maid Piang Ngaih Don in 2016 and also abused her grievously, was sentenced to a much longer imprisonment term of 30 years for culpable homicide and assault on 22 June 2021, which reportedly surpassed that of Ng Hua Chye, who was released at this point of time, as the longest sentence ever meted out to a maid abuser in Singapore. Gaiyathiri, who was initially charged with murder, was also assisted by her 62-year-old mother Prema Naraynasamy, who was jailed for 17 years on multiple charges of maid abuse, and her husband Kevin Chelvam, who is currently on trial for maid abuse and removing the evidence of the abuse.

== See also ==
- Murder of Piang Ngaih Don
