= Singapore Prisons Emergency Action Response =

Correctional emergency response team

- Active: 1 December 1977 – present
- Country: Singapore
- Type: Correctional emergency response team
- Role: Law enforcement Riot control Direct action Hostage rescue
- Part of: Singapore Prison Service
- Headquarters: Changi Prison
- Abbreviation: SPEAR

Structure
- Size: 70 officers (October 2024)

The Singapore Prisons Emergency Action Response (SPEAR) is a correctional emergency response team within the Singapore Prison Service (SPS).

SPEAR is a highly trained elite force that is deployed in various high risk special operations and prepared to quell any riots or fights within the prisons. It assists SPS officers in handling non-compliant inmates, intervening when necessary. Their expertise lies in using softer options like beanbag rounds and soft projectiles. They also share their tactics and insights with other Home Team units, as only SPEAR has this unique expertise.

As of October 2024, SPEAR claims that 70 officers are assigned to the unit. It is based at Changi Prison.

== History ==
SPEAR was founded on 1 December 1977 as the Special Action Prisons Unit (SAPU). The unit was trained by the Commandos formation of the Singapore Armed Forces (SAF).

== Capability ==
SPEAR officers are specialised in multiple areas, which are essential to make prisons safe in an ever-changing security climate, such as:

- Close-quarters riot control
- Transportation of high risk inmates
- Close protection
- Less lethal weaponry
- Dynamic entry
- Physical training
- Combat shooting
- Use of specialised weapons
- Tactical rappelling
- Close-quarters battle

Their core functions include responding to prison contingencies and exercises, performing high risk escort duties and training prison officers in various core tactical skills.

== Selection process ==
The selection process for SPEAR candidates requires them to go through a 500m standard obstacle course that includes monkey bars and a high wall; run 2km while wearing a weighted vest and a respirator mask; sprint 400m, then climb seven flights of stairs while carrying a total of 15kg of weights in both hands. They are then tested for teamwork by simulating evacuating a wounded prisoner.

The five-month long training program is called SPEAR Tactical Course (STC) and it equips officers with the tactical know-how in order to handle crucial situations such as hostage rescues and high-risk escorts. At the start of STC, officers undergo a conditioning phase to bring them to their best physical condition. Candidates need to finish the STC in order to be recruited into SPEAR.

A main feature of STC is the close-quarters riot control (CQRC), which sees officers learning an essential skill set that encompasses weapons training, close quarter combat (CQC) and other tactical capabilities. Upon achieving competency in those areas, they will proceed on to harness their ability to execute scenario-based missions.

Before passing out as SPEAR officers, they will embark on a 24 km route march where officers will be tasked with overcoming obstacles along the way within a given time frame.

== Equipment ==
SPEAR force members have access to battering rams and tools for forced entry along with the following weapons:

Model	Type	Origin	Reference
FN 303	Less-than-lethal	Belgium	
Tactical Electronic Distraction Device	Less-than-lethal	United States	
Glock 19	Semi-automatic pistol	Austria	
Heckler & Koch USP	Semi-automatic pistol	Germany	
Heckler & Koch MP5	Submachine gun	Germany	
Remington 870	Shotgun	United States	
Ithaca 37	Shotgun	United States	
Kel-Tec KSG	Shotgun	United States	
M4 carbine	Assault rifle	United States	
SAR-21	Assault rifle	Singapore	

== See also ==
- Special Tactics and Rescue (STAR)
