= Singapore Prison Service =

Singaporean government prison agency

Agency overview
- Formed: 1946; 80 years ago
- Type: Correctional agency
- Jurisdiction: Government of Singapore
- Headquarters: 980 Upper Changi Rd North, Singapore 507708
- Minister responsible: K Shanmugam, Minister for Home Affairs
- Agency executives: Shie Yong Lee, Commissioner of Prisons; SAC Rockey Francisco Junior, Deputy Commissioner of Prisons (Policy and Transformation); SAC Matthew Wee Yik Keong, Deputy Commissioner of Prisons (Operations and Rehabilitation)
- Parent department: Ministry of Home Affairs
- Parent agency: Ministry of Home Affairs
- Child agency: Singapore Prisons Emergency Action Response
- Website: http://www.sps.gov.sg
- Agency ID: T08GA0037K

The Singapore Prison Service (SPS) is a government agency of Singapore under the Ministry of Home Affairs. Based in Changi Prison Complex in the eastern part of Singapore, the service runs 14 prisons and drug rehabilitation centres in the country. Its responsibilities encompass the safe custody, rehabilitation and aftercare of offenders, and preventive education.

== History ==
=== Under British colonial rule (1825–1965) ===
On 18 April 1825, the first batch of penal convicts arrived in British-ruled Singapore and were housed in temporary huts along the Bras Basah Canal. The philosophy of deterrence through punitive measures rather than rehabilitation was adopted. In 1847, Outram Prison was built at Pearl's Hill but overcrowding remained a major issue and a continued punitive approach in prison management led to a high rate of recidivism.

In 1936, Changi Prison was opened and operational as a maximum security prison and as a training ground for the reform and rehabilitation of its inmates.

From 1942 to 1945 during World War II, Changi Prison was used as a prisoner-of-war camp.

After the war, the Singapore Prison Service was institutionalised as a government department in 1946 and G.E.W.W. Bayly became its first Commissioner.

=== Post-independence (1965–1999) ===
After Singapore gained independence in 1965, Quek Shi Lei was appointed Director of Prisons on 1 November 1973.

The Ministry of Home Affairs set up a Prisons Re-Organisation Committee to review the system of rehabilitation, industrial training and work discipline. A new system of classification was then adopted in which inmates were grouped into 16 classes under three broad categories.

On 1 January 1988, Tee Tua Ba took over Quek as Director of Prisons. Quek remained as an advisor to the Singapore Prison Service while chief executive officer of the Singapore Corporation of Rehabilitative Enterprises (SCORE), which is now known as Yellow Ribbon Singapore.

When Tee was posted to the Singapore Police Force as Commissioner of Police on 1 July 1992, Poh Geok Ek took over as Director of Prisons and until his retirement on 1 November 1998, and was succeeded by Chua Chin Kiat.

On 23 April 1994, Tanah Merah Prison and Changi Women's Prison were officially opened by Minister for Home Affairs Wong Kan Seng. On 31 December 1999, at the groundbreaking ceremony for the redevelopment of Changi Prison Complex, Wong also unveiled the new vision and revised mission for the Singapore Prison Service, together with the service's tagline "Captain of Lives".

=== 2000–present ===
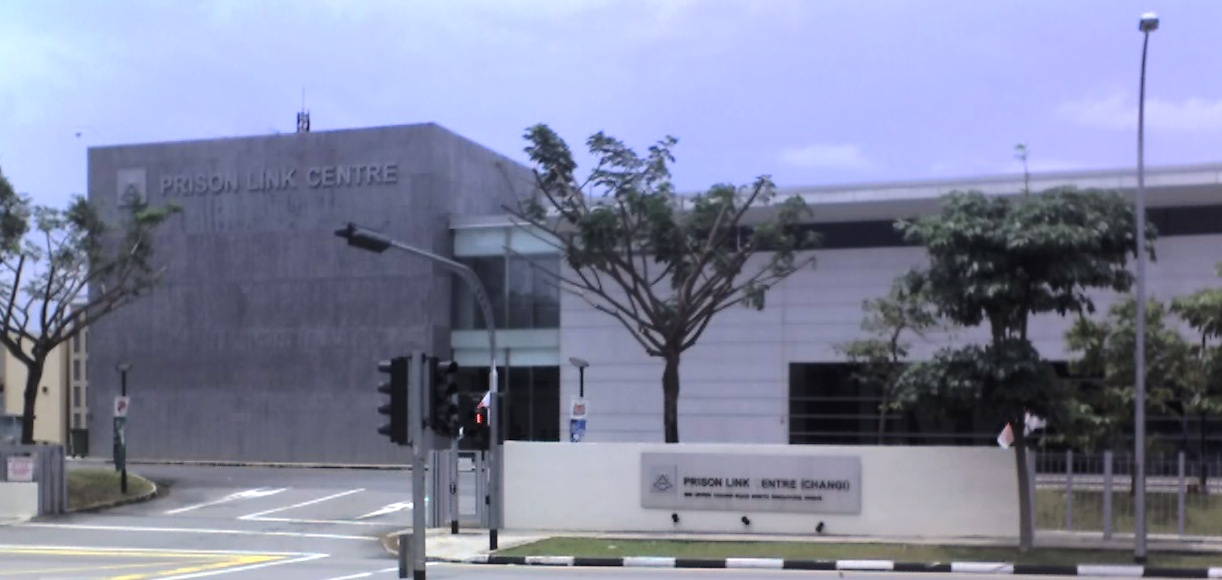
Changi Prison's main building (built in 2000)

On 3 January 2000, Kaki Bukit Centre was established as a prison school for inmates' education and skills learning. Teaching resources were centralised and more inmates were able to pursue further education.

In the present-day, Changi Prison Complex houses the most serious offenders in the country, including those serving long sentences (including life imprisonment) and those who have been sentenced to death. The prison complex is the detention centre for death row inmates before they are executed by long-drop hanging, which traditionally takes place on a Friday morning. Corporal punishment, in the form of caning, is also carried out twice a week in the prison complex.

The Yellow Ribbon Project, formerly the Singapore Corporation of Rehabilitative Enterprises, was renamed and launched on 2 October 2004 to raise public awareness and acceptance towards ex-offenders and support their re-integration into society.

On 1 November 2007, Ng Joo Hee succeeded Chua Chin Kiat as Director of Prisons after the latter left to serve as the executive director of Aetos Security Management. In the same year, Selarang Park Prison was also transformed to a community supervision centre to manage inmates on community-based programmes and released on supervision.

After two years as Director of Prisons, Ng was transferred to the Singapore Police Force to be Commissioner of Police. On 1 January 2010, Soh Wai Wah took over office as Director of Prisons. During his tenure, Soh oversaw the opening of Cluster B in Changi Prison Complex on 20 January 2010. The title "Director of Prisons" was also changed to "Commissioner of Prisons" during this time.

On 10 December 2012, it was announced that a new prison headquarters for Changi Prison Complex would be constructed by December 2014 at a cost of S$118.5 million. The project was awarded to Sembawang Engineers and Constructors, which is owned by Indian EPC company Punj Lloyd. After its construction, the prison headquarters has four main buildings and several smaller ancillary buildings for office facilities, a multi-purpose hall, a club house and an auditorium. It is also located closer to Clusters A and B within the prison complex.

In October 2016, Desmond Chin replaced Soh as Commissioner of Prisons. During Chin's tenure, the Singapore Prison Service obtained the Singapore Quality Award in 2019. Chin also oversaw various initiatives under the service's 2025 transformation plans, including the "Prisons Without Guards" programme which uses technology to automate mundane and routine tasks, as well as the "Prisons Without Walls" programmes which allows more inmates to be supervised in the community and support their reintegration into society.

On 28 September 2020, Shie Yong Lee succeeded Chin as Commissioner of Prisons, becoming the first woman to take up this role in Singapore.

== Organisation ==
The Singapore Prison Service is a uniformed organisation under the Ministry of Home Affairs. Its responsibilities encompass the safe custody, rehabilitation and aftercare of offenders, and preventive education. Its staff comprises uniformed officers as well as civilian staff, including psychologists and counsellors

=== Rank Structure ===
The rank structure of Singapore Prison Service is as such, in order of ascending seniority:

Rank	Abbreviation	Rank insignia
Corporal	CPL	
Sergeant	SGT	
Staff Sergeant	SSGT	
Chief Warder 1	CW1	
Chief Warder 2	CW2	
Senior Chief Warder 1	SCW1	
Senior Chief Warder 2	SCW2	
Rehabilitation Officer 1	RO1	
Rehabilitation Officer 2	RO2	
Assistant Superintendent of Prisons	ASP	
Deputy Superintendent of Prisons	DSP	
Superintendent of Prisons	SUPT	
Deputy Assistant Commissioner of Prisons	DAC	
Assistant Commissioner of Prisons	AC	
Senior Assistant Commissioner of Prisons	SAC	
Deputy Commissioner of Prisons	DC	
Commissioner of Prisons	-	

=== Organisational structure ===
The Singapore Prison Service currently administers 15 institutions. They make up the service's line units and are grouped under five Commands – Cluster A and B contain five institutions each, which are situated within Changi Prison Complex. Cluster C, with two institutions, is situated at the adjacent Tanah Merah Centre. The Community Corrections Command oversees Lloyd Leas Community Supervision Centre, Community Rehabilitation Centre, and Selarang Halfway House. In addition to them, the Operations and Security Command oversees and manages Changi Prison Complex Security and the Prison Link Centres.

== Related initiatives ==
=== CARE Network ===
The Community Action for the Rehabilitation of Ex-Offenders (CARE) Network was formed in May 2000 to coordinate and to improve the effectiveness of various agencies engaging in rehabilitative works for ex-offenders in Singapore.

The CARE Network is the first formal structure that brings together key community and government agencies to promote seamless in-care to aftercare support for ex-offenders. The network consists of eight major community and government organisations responsible for the rehabilitation of ex-offenders.

=== Community-Based Programmes ===
Overseen by the Community Operations Command (COMC), Community-Based Programmes represent a step-down approach to help offenders make a seamless transition from incare to aftercare by allowing them to serve the tail-end of their sentences in the community. These include the Home Detention Scheme, Halfway House Scheme and Work Release Scheme, where offenders are supervised and counselled by officers from different community and government agencies. In 2018, there were 1,098 inmates on Community-Based Programmes, an increase of 15.4% from the previous year.

== Technology ==
In 2017, the Singapore Prison Service announced its Prison Without Guards transformation plan, which uses technology to enhance operational capabilities and enable prison officers to take up higher order jobs.

Rolled out to all institutions in October 2015, iKiosk has multiple functions that allow inmates to perform self-service tasks. This includes submitting administrative requests (for example, asking for extra letter-writing materials), checking the status of these requests and redeeming privileges.

Launched as part of a pilot project in 2017 in Changi Prison Complex, the Digital Rehabilitation Records Management System automatically tracks inmate activities and attendance records through near field communications technology embedded within inmates’ wrist tags. Inmates can also make purchases by scanning their wrist tags at self-service vending machines.

The Millimetre Wave Body Scanner is designed to screen and detect hidden or contraband objects under inmates' clothing and reduce the reliance on physical searches.

Avatar, launched in 2018, is a human behaviour detection system that uses facial recognition technology and video analytics to recognise aggression and detect abnormal activities in the cell. The system triggers an alert within 15 to 30 seconds of detecting such actions, which could include violence, fighting or suicide attempts.

The Digitisation of Inmate Rehabilitation and Corrections Tool (DIRECT), launched in 2019, provides inmates with shared tablets that allow them to access apps such as e-books, e-news, e-letters and e-learning to support them in their rehabilitation.

== Equipment ==
Although the Singapore Prison Service officers are armed with less-than-lethal weapons such as the Monadnock PR-24 side handle baton/knightstick (more commonly known as the T-baton) and pepper spray while on duty, they are trained in firearms, which may be issued depending on the circumstances.

=== Firearms ===
Name	Country of origin	Type
Taurus Model 85	Brazil	Revolver
Glock 19	Austria	Semi-automatic pistol
Ithaca 37	United States	Shotgun
Remington 870	United States	Shotgun
Heckler & Koch MP5	Germany	Submachine gun
M16 rifle	United States	Assault rifle
FN 303	Belgium	Less-lethal option
Pepperball TAC700	United States	Less-lethal option
Pepperball TAC-SF	United States	Less-lethal option

=== Vehicles ===
- Nissan Diesel - Bus
- Isuzu S7 - Bus
- Toyota Coaster - Bus
- Fiat Ducato - Van
- Iveco Daily - Van
- Toyota Hiace- Van
- Toyota Hilux - Pickup truck

== In popular culture ==
Films

- One More Chance (三个好人) (2005), directed by Jack Neo and starring Mark Lee, Marcus Chin and Henry Thia as three ex-offenders facing social stigma and challenges reintegrating into society after their release. It was produced in collaboration with the CARE Network and shown at the start of the Yellow Ribbon Project's 2005 campaign.
- Apprentice (2016), directed by Boo Junfeng and starring Firdaus Rahman as a new prison warder whose father was hanged for drug trafficking. He is assigned as an "apprentice" to the chief hangman portrayed by Wan Hanafi Su. The film depicts the controversial death penalty from an executioner's point of view.

Television dramas produced by MediaCorp Channel 8

- Behind Bars (铁狱雷霆) (1991), starring Chen Hanwei as a new prison warder and Chen Tianwen as a prison warden whose father is currently serving a jail term.
- Kinship (手足) (2007), starring Jesseca Liu as a prison warden who was born in prison while her mother was on death row after taking the blame for her drug-trafficking father.
- The Homecoming (十三鞭) (2007), starring Li Nanxing, Rayson Tan, Zheng Geping and Brandon Wong as four friends who were sentenced to imprisonment and caning for arson when they were younger. One of them received one more stroke than the others and became convinced that he had been betrayed. Years later, he sets out to find out who the traitor was and take his revenge.
- On the Fringe (边缘父子) (2011), a remake of a 1988 drama, starring Li Nanxing as an ex-offender who reunites with his son and stops him from falling into juvenile delinquency.

Others

- Tuesday Report (星期二特写), a long-running documentary by Channel 8. On 18 September 2012, it featured a pastry workshop set up by 717 Trading in Changi Prison which employed about 40 inmates to meet its business needs in refrigerating fruits and making desserts.
- Inside Maximum Security (2022), a documentary by CNA showing the lives of five inmates serving time in Changi Prison's maximum security cluster for committing various serious crimes.
