= Murder of Piang Ngaih Don =

2016 case of a Myanmar maid abused and killed in Singapore

Piang Ngaih Don
- Piang Ngaih Don before her death
- Born: Piang Ngaih Don; 13 June 1992; Dimpi Village, Chin State, Myanmar
- Died: 26 July 2016 (aged 24); Bishan, Singapore
- Cause of death: Hypoxic ischaemic encephalopathy
- Resting place: Dimpi Village, Chin State, Myanmar
- Education: Grade 9 in school
- Occupations: Construction worker and farmer (Myanmar); Domestic worker (Singapore)
- Employers: Gaiyathiri Murugayan; Prema S. Naraynasamy; Kevin Chelvam
- Known for: Victim of an abuse and murder case
- Children: Mung Lam Tuang (son)
- Parent(s): Unnamed father and mother (died between 1996 and 1997)

Piang Ngaih Don (13 June 1992 – 26 July 2016) was a Burmese maid working in Singapore who was tortured, starved and beaten to death by her employers.

Her killers were Prema S. Naraynasamy, an elderly woman, and her daughter, Gaiyathiri Murugayan. Both women, the latter of whom employed the deceased maid, were arrested and charged with murder in relation to the death of the maid. A third accomplice, Kevin Chelvam, Gaiyathiri's husband and a police officer, was suspended from the police force after he was charged with being involved in the abuse as well as attempting to hide evidence.

Five years after Piang was murdered, Gaiyathiri was the first to stand trial, and she was sentenced to 30 years’ imprisonment for a reduced charge of culpable homicide and other hurt-related charges on 22 June 2021. Gayathiri's mother Prema, whose murder charge was temporarily withdrawn, was sentenced to a total of seventeen years in prison in the first half of 2023 for her remaining other charges of maid abuse and removing evidence of the maid abuse. Chelvam was convicted and sentenced to ten years' jail in 2025 for his abuse of Piang and for concealing evidence.

The death of the maid shocked the public in Singapore given the extensive physical mistreatment of the maid, who was also said to have been starved and not given any time to rest. This also alarmed the government who decided to review and implement new policies to monitor the welfare of all foreign maids.

== Early life of the victim ==
Born on 13 June 1992, Piang Ngaih Don was the daughter of two farmers residing in a rural village known as Dimpi Village, which was part of the Tedim Township in Chin State, one of the poorest states in Myanmar. The village has a population of about 1,500 people, and it is located in a mountainous area. The only route to the place was a four-hour drive on a muddy road from Kalay Township.

When Piang was four years old, her unnamed parents died within a year of each other, most likely between 1996 and 1997. Piang also has ten siblings, including an older brother Pau Sian Mung (b. 1983 or 1984) and an older sister Ciang Lam Man. Five of her siblings died before Piang herself died in Singapore, leaving only her older brother Pau and two of her sisters (including Ciang) and two other siblings of unconfirmed gender left alive at the time of her death.

Piang and her siblings were raised Catholic. The orphaned Piang and her surviving siblings used the farmland left behind by their late parents to make a living for themselves. Piang only studied up to Grade 9 in school, before she left at age 15. In the early 2010s, Piang first met her lover and later became pregnant with his child, but the lover left her while she was still carrying her unborn child. In around February 2013, Piang gave birth to her first and only child, a son named Mung Lam Tuang. A fellow villager and neighbour who worked in Singapore described Piang as a "quiet" individual who was close to her family.

As an adult, Piang took up a job as a construction worker, but she quit as the salary was low and she wanted to earn more to support her family, after hearing from some other villagers that the wages of employment in Singapore were higher.

== Employment and abuse ==
=== Preparations and employment ===
Having heard about the higher income she could get from jobs in Singapore, Piang prepared to go there so that she could provide a better life for her son and family. She was said to have planned to work there as a domestic maid for two to three years, as she wanted to buy a plot of land to build a house for herself and her son in Kalay Township.

However, at the point of time she decided to leave Myanmar for Singapore, Piang was still two months shy of reaching 23 years old, the legal minimum age of working as a domestic maid in Singapore. Since she was not yet 23, Piang would have been ineligible to take up the job in Singapore. However, Piang staked out her money for her agent, who bribed an immigration officer from Yangon to change her date of birth to 13 April 1992, exactly two months earlier than her real birth date, and the change was completed when Yangon authorities first issued Piang's passport on 11 April 2015. This allowed Piang to look like she was minimally old enough to become a maid in Singapore, and she first arrived in Singapore in May 2015.

When this information was revealed after Piang's eventual death at the hands of her employers, there was no capture made by the authorities as both the agent and officer were never identified or found.

After she arrived in Singapore, Piang, then 22 years old, was hired by a family living in Bishan. Piang's employer was Gaiyathiri Murugayan, a 35-year-old housewife who was married to Kevin Chelvam, a 37-year-old police staff sergeant from the Singapore Police Force. Gaiyathiri had two children, a four-year-old daughter and an infant son, and her elderly mother Prema S. Naraynasamy, aged 57, lived with her in the same flat at Bishan. There were also two tenants living at the flat. Piang was the fifth maid to work for the Bishan household after four previous domestic workers, and her first day of work began on 28 May 2015.

=== Abuse ===
During her term of employment, Piang faced a series of harsh and abusive treatments from her employer and her family, which started soon after she worked for the family. Firstly, Piang was not allowed to have a mobile phone or at least a day off every week. Gaiyathiri was said to have disliked the maid for being unhygienic, too slow and eating too much. She set a series of harsh rules to force Piang to obey. Gaiyathiri would shout when she felt Piang was being disobedient. This escalated to physical abuse five months later in October 2015.

The physical abuses were inflicted upon Piang almost daily, often several times a day. The CCTV cameras, originally set by Chelvam to monitor his two children and his maid, had captured most of the physical abuse that occurred in the last month before Piang died. The retrieved footage showed Gaiyathiri pouring cold water on Piang, slapping, pushing, punching, kicking her and stomping on her while the maid was on the floor. She also used objects like a plastic bottle or metal ladle to assault Piang, and pulled her hair while lifting her off from the floor and shaking her violently. She also burned Piang with a heated iron and choked her. At one point, such abuses happened in the presence of Gaiyathiri's infant son, who was playing games at one side while Piang was subjected to physical torture nearby.

Aside from that, the maid was also deprived of food and rest. She was only allowed to sleep five hours a day, and she was only allowed to eat sliced bread soaked in water, cold food straight from the refrigerator or some rice at night. She was told to do her chores wearing multiple layers of face masks due to Gaiyathiri finding her unhygienic. Piang was also forced to use the toilet with the toilet door open. Other than Gaiyathiri, Prema was Piang's other major abuser. Chelvam had also used a bat at one point to hit Piang.

When Piang was examined by doctors during her two medical check-ups, which took place six and 10 months after her employment, the doctors found that something was amiss as they found scars and bruises on Piang's body. Each time, Piang's employers passed it off by saying that Piang was too clumsy and often fell down. Piang's employment agency also spoke with her on two separate occasions, but nothing abnormal was reported. Chelvam, who gave his feedback to the MOM about his maid's conduct and working performance, often rejected the offers made by MOM to replace her with another maid.

== Death ==
Despite not having a mobile phone, Piang managed to make a phone call five times to her family members in Myanmar. During her first four phone calls, Piang never complained to them about her job. However, in her fifth phone call made on 12 July 2016, Piang told her family that she wanted to go home as she was not feeling well. This would be the last time Piang would speak to her family members. Shortly after she called her family, Piang was tied to the window grille at night while she slept on the floor. This went on for the final 12 days of her life, in addition to the abuse she suffered daily.

On the night of 25 July 2016, Gaiyathiri and Prema had beaten up Piang and tied her hand to a window grille before leaving her on the floor. They also poured water on her. Piang was said to have pleaded for mercy, but Gaiyathiri said she deserved it for allegedly stealing food from the refrigerator. The next day, at 5 am, Gaiyathiri also kicked and stomped on Piang's head and neck area, grabbed her by the hair and pulled her head back such that her neck extended backwards twice, and choked Piang, who was, by this time, unresponsive to her assaults. Gaiyathiri believed she simply did not want to wake up.

At around 7.30 am, after Chelvam left for work, Piang was found motionless on the floor. Both Prema and Gaiyathiri tried to revive her but failed. At the suggestion of Prema, a doctor was contacted. Gaiyathiri called the clinic between 9.30am and 9.45am and asked for a house call. She lied to the nurse that she found the victim on the kitchen floor. She also declined to call for an ambulance and insisted that a doctor come over. While they waited for a doctor, the two women changed Piang's wet clothes with clean ones.

At 10.50 am, the clinic doctor, Dr Grace Kwan, arrived at the Bishan flat to tend to Piang. She told the women that Piang was dead. Both women were shocked and they quickly lied that Piang had moved minutes earlier. Dr Kwan called an ambulance, and 40 minutes later, the paramedics arrived, pronouncing the 24-year-old Piang dead. The cause of her death was hypoxic ischaemic encephalopathy with severe blunt trauma to her neck. An autopsy by forensic pathologist Dr George Paul revealed that she had suffered multiple injuries – precisely 31 recent scars and 47 external injuries – and she was so emaciated and undernourished that she would have died of starvation if the ill-treatment had been prolonged. Another contributing factor was that the choking by Gaiyathiri had led to the brain being deprived of oxygen and led to Piang's death. As a result of excessive starvation, Piang was found to have lost nearly 38% of her weight, only weighing 24 kg when she died.

During her court appearance in 2023, Dr Kwan stated that Piang was so severely underweight that it was like skin wrapping up the bones of her limbs. Similarly, Dr Paul also said that the BMI index of Piang was about 11, indicating that she was severely malnourished, and at such a low BMI index, something only apparent to those with TB or advanced cancer, Piang's life would have been endangered, and her low intake of nutrition compounded her inability to tolerate the repeated abuse and trauma.

== Arrest of the suspects ==
=== Capture and charges ===
After the death of Piang, both Gaiyathiri, then 36, and her mother Prema, then 58, were immediately arrested by the police. The mother-daughter pair arrived at the state courts of Singapore, where they were charged with first-degree murder under the Penal Code. If found guilty, both Gaiyathiri and Prema would be sentenced to death by hanging (all four degrees of murder in Singapore are considered capital offences). Many neighbours were said to be shocked over their arrest. One neighbour said that she did not hear anything amiss the night before, and another remembered the maid as a polite girl. A third noted that she looked thin.

Later, investigations also led to the arrest of Gaiyathiri's husband Kevin Chelvam in August 2016. He was suspended from the police force and faced charges of voluntarily causing grievous hurt to Piang. He was also set to face disciplinary hearings by the police force for his conduct while on duty as an officer in the force. He was found to have tried to remove evidence of maid abuse by removing the CCTV cameras to prevent his wife and mother-in-law from facing any retribution from the law. Earlier, Chelvam had lied to the police that he removed the cameras on the request of the tenants six months before the crime but it was discovered that he did it soon after the murder of Piang. The two tenants living in the flat where the maid died were not charged for any assumed involvement in the maid abuse and murder.

=== Psychiatric remand ===
Both Prema and Gaiyathiri were remanded in prison to undergo psychiatric assessments. These assessments lasted for four years and finally ended in April 2020. Similarly, the complexity of the various offences committed against Piang led to investigations dragging on for about four to five years.

In the case of Gaiyathiri, during her psychiatric remand, she was assessed to have suffered from two major psychiatric disorders. One of them was obsessive–compulsive personality disorder, which existed for some time prior to Piang's abuse and the birth of Gaiyathiri's second child and gave her an excessive obsession with cleanliness. The second was postpartum depression, which manifested shortly after she gave birth to her second child. This disorder catalysed the deterioration of her condition for the prior personality disorder. The two disorders were found to have impaired her mental responsibility at the time she repeatedly inflicted the abuse and eventually murdered Piang.

As such, Gaiyathiri's murder charge was reduced to one of first-degree culpable homicide not amounting to murder, the most serious charge of non-capital homicide which warrants a sentence of life imprisonment or up to twenty years’ imprisonment, and caning or a fine. Being a female, Gaiyathiri would not be caned. During the time she was in remand, Gaiyathiri and Chelvam officially divorced on 13 January 2020 in the midst of their respective court proceedings for the murder and abuse of Piang.

== Trial of Gaiyathiri Murugayan ==
=== Guilty plea and sentencing submissions ===
On 23 February 2021, the first day of Gaiyathiri's trial started in the High Court. 40-year-old Gaiyathiri, who was represented by lawyers Sunil Sudheesan and Diana Ngiam, pleaded guilty to one single charge of culpable homicide, as well as 27 other charges of causing hurt and torturing the deceased Piang Ngaih Don. Another 87 charges relating to the maid abuse were to be taken into consideration during sentencing.

Deputy Public Prosecutor (DPP) Mohamed Faizal Mohamed Abdul Kadir, who led the prosecution, sought the maximum sentence of life imprisonment. He stated that the case was exceptionally horrific and heinous, making Gaiyathiri deserving of a life-long period of incarceration behind bars. DPP Mohamed Faizal gave a description of the case, "This is a case where, simply put, words fail us. That one human being would treat another in this evil and utterly inhumane manner is cause for the righteous anger of the court." As for the defence, both Sudheesan and Ngiam sought a global sentence of 14 years’ imprisonment. They implored for the court to show mercy on Gaiyathiri on the grounds of her mental disorders that occurred since February 2015, which were aggravated by the abortion of her third child in February 2016, compelling her to cause great harm to Piang. Gaiyathiri also asked for mercy and promised to continue her medical treatment.

After hearing the submissions, High Court judge See Kee Oon reserved his sentencing verdict and would give his final judgement on a later date, and the date was confirmed to be 29 April 2021.

=== Change of lawyers ===
On 29 April 2021, the date when Gaiyathiri was supposed to be sentenced, Gaiyathiri attempted to avoid a potential verdict of lifetime incarceration by telling the court that she might retract her guilty plea. Not only that, Gaiyathiri, who turned 41 sometime before the date of sentencing, also changed lawyers and engaged Joseph Chen to replace both Ngiam and Sudheesan. Chen also asked for time to negotiate with the prosecution to further reduce his client's first-degree culpable homicide charge to a lower charge of second-degree culpable homicide, which meant a lack of intention to kill or cause fatal injuries (but not murder) and thus attracts a lower maximum penalty of up to 15 years’ imprisonment. Gaiyathiri also asked for the court to impose a gag order and disallow the newspapers to report her name for the sake of her two children and protect them from any social ostracisation. The next date of hearing was postponed until 22 June 2021.

Gaiyathiri returned to court on 22 June 2021. By then, the defence counsel decided to give up pursuing a further reduction of the first-degree culpable homicide charge against Gaiyathiri. Chen submitted new sentencing submissions on behalf of Gaiyathiri. He asked for the court to be lenient and impose a much lower sentence of eight to nine years’ imprisonment for culpable homicide given her psychiatric condition and stated that it was due to the victim being unhygienic that Gaiyathiri was stressed over the additional burden of taking care of her children and coping with their illnesses, which she claimed were caused by the lack of cleanliness on the part of the maid. He claimed that these stressors contributed to his client's growth as a sadistic and violent maid-abuser. He hoped that rehabilitation was the major principle behind his client's sentence so that she and the other mothers suffering from postpartum depression could have a "healing effect" from the outcome, and stated that the four previous maids were not abused by Gaiyathiri.

However, the prosecution did not relent and maintained their firm stance to press for a life sentence on Gaiyathiri, stating that it was precisely due to her mental disorders that her original murder charge was reduced. DPP Mohamed Faizal called the case a "shocking case without parallel", and called the accused's actions heinous and cruel. He also said that Gaiyathiri was clearly unremorseful as she placed the blame on Piang for her alleged uncleanliness and both Gaiyathiri's violence and the offences were clearly not related to the hygienic reasons. Rather, the prosecutor described the violence and murder as "a function of the accused (Gaiyathiri) viewing the victim (Piang) as a lesser human being". He pointed out that the only time when Gaiyathiri showed regret was when she was caught and punished. In response to the gag order application, the DPP also said that Gaiyathiri's children should not be used as an excuse for a lighter punishment given that the accused was the one who committed an extremely serious and shocking crime and it thus became a high-profile case that attracted significant media attention. While he mostly pushed for lifelong imprisonment, DPP Mohamed Faizal also laid out an alternative: should the court not desire a sentence of lifelong incarceration in Gaiyathiri's case, the total aggregate sentence should be more than 27 years’ imprisonment.

=== High Court sentencing ===
Gaiyathiri Murugayan
- Born: c. 1980; Singapore
- Status: Incarcerated since 26 July 2016
- Convictions: Culpable homicide not amounting to murder (1 count); 27 charges of voluntarily causing hurt and/or grievous hurt
- Penalty: 30 years' imprisonment (22 June 2021)
- Accomplices: Prema S. Naraynasamy (mother and accomplice); Kevin Chelvam (ex-husband and accomplice)

Details
- Victims: 1
- Date: October 2015 – 26 July 2016
- Country: Singapore
- Date apprehended: 27 July 2016

Soon after hearing the new submissions on sentence, Justice See Kee Oon was ready with his verdict on the same day of 22 June 2021. Justice See pronounced in court that he decided to sentence 41-year-old Gaiyathiri to 30 years’ imprisonment, falling short of the life sentence mainly sought by the prosecution. In his judgement, Justice See described the untimely death of Piang Ngaih Don as "among the worst cases of culpable homicide", given that the unfortunate maid was extensively subjected to both psychological and physical harm before she died. Justice See said in his own words about the case, "Words cannot adequately describe the abject cruelty of the accused's appalling conduct."

Justice See took note that Gaiyathiri was not pathologically violent since she did not receive reports of maid abuse from her previous four domestic workers. Her judgement was significantly impaired by the mental disorders she had, which contributed to her offences, and she was responding to medical treatment with a diagnosis that she no longer posed a danger to the public or a risk at re-offending. Hence he was not persuaded that the court's righteous anger should be invoked to commit Gaiyathiri to lifetime imprisonment.

Still, Justice See did not mince his words when he harshly admonished Gaiyathiri in court for her lack of remorse over the death of Piang since she had lied to the police and medical professionals about Piang's condition. He also pointed out the psychiatric reports that cited that despite her conditions, Gaiyathiri was fully aware of the magnitude of her actions. The judge also ruled that based on the balance of mitigating and aggravating factors, even though he did not feel desirous of a life sentence in Gaiyathiri's case, he found that a long, extended period of incarceration should be warranted to reflect "signal societal outrage and abhorrence". He also rejected the proposal for a gag order.

Based on the circumstances of the case, Justice See first imposed the alternative maximum sentence of 20 years’ imprisonment for the most serious charge of culpable homicide. He also meted a consecutive term of ten years’ imprisonment that were applied to the various degrees of hurt Gaiyathiri inflicted on Piang. In total, Gaiyathiri was ordered to serve 30 years in jail, which included the time she spent in remand before her trial and sentencing. Justice See addressed Gaiyathiri that had it not been her mental disorders influencing her into committing the crimes, he would have sentenced her to spend the rest of her natural life in prison without hesitation.

It was later reported that Gaiyathiri's family requested her lawyer to appeal for a lighter sentence.

Gaiyathiri's sentence was considered the longest term of imprisonment imposed upon a maid abuser and killer, surpassing that of freelance tour guide Ng Hua Chye, who was jailed for 18 and a half years and caned 12 strokes in 2002 for abusing and killing his 19-year-old Indonesian maid Muawanatul Chasanah. Ng was convicted of culpable homicide and four charges of voluntarily causing hurt to Chasanah after pleading guilty.

=== Psychological analysis ===
From the account of Gaiyathiri's life prior to her killing of her maid, she was said to be so obsessed with cleanliness that she wanted her former husband to drive her to a clean toilet from her workplace every day. At home, she asked her then sister-in-law to wear a shower cap in the flat after she found the woman's hair falling on the floor. She also wanted her family members to wear facial masks to avoid any contamination from their nasal discharges. She even daily did excessive cleaning around the house and washing her hands.

Psychiatric experts were interviewed shortly after Gaiyathiri was sentenced, as there were inquiries over how an ordinary housewife like Gaiyathiri could develop into a violent and callous maid abuser and murderer. Having analysed the case, the experts said that it was extremely rare for people with depression to turn to violence, especially when other relevant factors were not present.

One of them, Dr Lim Boon Leng, stated that violence is rarely associated with depression, to an extreme degree. He also gave his opinion that it could be the presence of other factors, such as a vulnerable victim and a projection of one's negative views onto the victim, in Gaiyathiri's case that might have created the "perfect storm" that sparked the abuse and death of Piang. Another medical expert, Dr Annabelle Chow, posited that Gaiyathiri might have poor sleep and a short temper induced by depression, and had an inability to control her anger. Her anger might have culminated to the point that similarly to a pressure cooker, she was ready to unleash her anger in the form of an explosion.

=== Gaiyathiri's appeal ===
==== Gaiyathiri's attempt to submit additional evidence ====
In the course of appealing against her 30-year sentence to the Court of Appeal, Gaiyathiri sought to introduce additional evidence to support her appeal. She alleged that she was being abused physically and sexually by her fellow inmates behind bars, and both she and her mother Prema have been denied proper medical treatment and care by the Singapore Prison Service (SPS) while in prison. She also claimed she exchanged WhatsApp messages with Piang Ngaih Don's relatives and Piang's family forgave her for her actions. Gaiyathiri also made allegations against her former counsel and the prosecution, casting doubt on her admission of guilt. She even tried to submit psychiatric reports of two different psychiatrists to cast differences between the original report by her original psychiatrist Dr Derrick Yeo of the IMH.

However, Deputy Public Prosecutor Mohamed Faizal Mohamed Abdul Kadir argued that there was no substantial basis for Gaiyathiri to admit the requested additional evidence in her appeal. With regards to Gaiyathiri's allegations against the SPS, the agency has stated that both women have been provided appropriate treatment and care during their stay in prison. Also, for the alleged assault incidents between Gaiyathiri and her fellow cellmates, the SPS has made full investigations and appropriately punished the relevant parties; there were two assault incidents in 2019 where Gaiyathiri was the aggressor and not the victim. DPP Mohamed Faizal, who was assisted by Senthilkumaran Sabapathy and Sean Teh in making the submissions, argued that it was entirely implausible for Gaiyathiri to have any form of contact with Piang's relatives since she did not have access to mobile devices from the time she was first locked away in jail.

Furthermore, DPP Mohamed Faizal also argued, "The entire application reeks of an attempt to fish for evidence with the fanciful hope that some of the evidence could be used in her favour." The prosecutor also pointed out these attempts demonstrated Gaiyathiri's complete lack of repentance and/or remorse for committing one of the most heinous instances of abuse and culpable homicide in Singapore's history. In his own words, DPP Mohamed Faizal made a description of Gaiyathiri's application for additional evidence:

"It is a desperate and audacious (not to mention, belated) attempt to deflect blame to everyone except herself for her present predicament, in the hope that doing so would allow her to escape her just desserts in the form of a sufficiently stiff sentence."

On 4 May 2022, the Court of Appeal denied Gaiyathiri's application to introduce new evidence in her case, because they accepted the prosecution's arguments that there was no basis to admit any new evidence in hearing Gaiyathiri's upcoming appeal, and described the new evidence presented by Gaiyathiri as "irrelevant".

==== Dismissal of appeal ====
On 29 June 2022, the Court of Appeal rejected Gaiyathiri's appeal to reduce her sentence.

The three Judges of Appeal Andrew Phang, Judith Prakash and Steven Chong, in dismissing the appeal, did not accept Gaiyathiri's argument that her sentence was manifestly excessive, and also disagreed that she deserved a lighter sentence of 12 to 15 years behind bars. They stated that they agreed with all the findings of the trial judge See Kee Onn that Gaiyathiri was completely unremorseful or unrepentant over Piang Ngaih Don's murder, given that she sought to justify her conduct against the victim with her psychiatric disorders, and continued to "blame anything and anyone but herself" for her atrocities.

The judges also rebutted that she was not mistreated in prison and pointed out that Gaiyathiri was given legal representation and not pressured into pleading guilty in contrast to her claims, since it was likely an afterthought she concocted over an unfavourable sentence. Not only that, Justice Phang, who pronounced the verdict, stated that after considering the facts of the case, the court concluded there was no basis in reducing Gaiyathiri's 30-year sentence due to the aggravating nature of Piang's killing:

"Given the severity of the offences that the appellant (Gaiyathiri) had committed... the public interest in condemning the crime is so significant that even if there had been exceptional circumstances, the court cannot countenance any reduction of her sentence."

After the dismissal of her appeal, Gaiyathiri expressed her intent to write to Prime Minister Lee Hsien Loong to seek mercy, stating, "Because it's my life and my mother's life. I cannot die here."

In the aftermath, Gayathiri's former lawyer Joseph Chen, who helped Gayathiri to obtain her medical records despite his knowledge that such evidence would not be vital or hold merit in the appeal, was ordered to pay S$3,000 in personal costs to the prosecution, as a penalty for his improper conduct and acting with a lack of good faith during the court proceedings.

== Trial of Prema S. Naraynasamy ==
=== Prema's guilty plea and first trial ===
While her daughter Gayathiri Murugayan was still serving her 30-year sentence in prison, 63-year-old Prema S. Naraynasamy, who faced a total of 50 charges for the murder and abuse of Piang Ngaih Don, eventually had her murder charge withdrawn as the courts granted her a discharge not amounting to an acquittal. It meant that while Prema no longer faced the murder charge, should new evidence arise in the case and investigations, the murder charge could be revived against her. Thus in other words, Prema could still face the death penalty or life imprisonment if the murder charge was renewed against her.

On 28 January 2022, it was reported that Prema, who was represented by M Ravi, intended to plead guilty to the hurt-related charges relating to Piang's death. However, due to Ravi's prolonged medical leave and extended suspension in view of his relapse from bipolar disorder, Prema's case was adjourned to 21 February, and according to Deputy Public Prosecutor (DPP) Senthilkumaran Sabapathy, Prema would be represented by another defence lawyer, who would replace Ravi as her counsel in court.

On 21 November 2022, Prema, who turned 64 sometime before her first trial, pleaded guilty to 48 charges of maid abuse, though she was contesting the 49th and final charge of causing evidence to disappear. Prema's case for the first 48 charges meanwhile, was adjourned for mitigation and sentencing on 9 January 2023.

=== Prema's sentence ===
Prema S. Naraynasamy
- Born: c. 1958; Singapore
- Status: Incarcerated since 26 July 2016
- Convictions: Voluntarily causing hurt and/or grievous hurt (48 counts); Causing evidence to disappear (1 count)
- Penalty: 17 years' imprisonment
- Accomplices: Gayathiri Murugayan (daughter and accomplice); Kevin Chelvam (ex-son-in-law and accomplice)

Details
- Victims: 1
- Date: October 2015 – 26 July 2016
- Country: Singapore
- Date apprehended: 27 July 2016

On 9 January 2023, during Prema's sentencing trial, DPP Sabapathy sought a sentence of between 14 and 16 years' imprisonment on account of the "shocking and heinous nature" of the crime, and he highlighted that there was an extremely high level of culpability on Prema's part since she had inflicted a high degree of physical and psychological harm upon Piang, who had been "dragged and thrown around the house like a rag doll". In DPP Sabapathy's words, Piang's life was a "living nightmare", which was in no small part from Prema's contribution to the daily abuse suffered by the Myanmar maid.

On the other hand, Prema's lawyer Rai Satish asked for ten years' jail, claiming that his client, who was a "loving grandmother", had been unfairly painted as a "vile and wicked person", since she had only committed the abuse due to her frustration towards Piang after hearing her daughter's complaints, and that there were also instances where Prema did show some kindness to Piang by giving her food and putting first aid on her wounds. Satish stated that Prema did not deserve a long and crushing sentence, as it may cut off her time and opportunity to be with her grandchildren, and that she showed regret for the crime after spending about six years and six months in remand. Other details of Prema's life such as her father's death during her childhood, the death of her son by suicide in 1998 and the need to take care of her ailing husband were also highlighted as factors in favour of Prema during her mitigation plea.

On the same day, Principal District Judge Toh Han Li aligned himself with the prosecution's arguments and sentenced 64-year-old Prema S. Naraynasamy to 14 years' imprisonment. Judge Toh rejected the emphasized instances of kindness shown by Prema, as he stated that such factors cannot absolve Prema of her culpability and her viciousness towards Piang Ngaih Don up till her death.

In his own words, Judge Toh described the degree of cruelty and cold-hearted conduct of Prema in the case:

“The deceased (Piang) is no longer with us to speak of her suffering but footages from the CCTV showed the shocking picture of the abuse and how emaciated and weak she was before her passing.”

Judge Toh also stated that there was a need to deter like-minded offenders from further perpetuating maid abuse, and on a balance of probabilities, a sentence of fourteen years was not a crushing sentence in Prema's case. The jail term was backdated to the date of Prema’s capture on 26 July 2016. Prema reportedly showed no emotion when the 14-year sentence was passed upon her. She also reportedly asked for permission to make a phone call home.

=== Prema's second trial and outcome ===
For her 49th and final charge of causing the evidence of a murder case to disappear, Prema, who claimed trial for the charge, was brought to court on 15 June 2023, and she pleaded guilty to the charge of instigating Kevin Chelvam to get rid of the CCTV evidence that filmed scenes of the maid abuse. It was revealed that after removing the CCTV recorder, Chelvam passed it to Prema, who entrusted the recorder to her daughter-in-law whose husband subsequently gave to a friend for safekeeping before he passed it to the police upon their request.

The trial prosecutor Sean Teh, having highlighted the aggravating factors of the Piang Ngaih Don case, sought a sentence of at least three years’ imprisonment and additionally requested the trial judge to order this particular sentence to run consecutively with Prema’s 14-year sentence from her first trial. As for Prema's lawyer Rai Satish, they requested for leniency and asked the judge to sentence Prema to between 18 and 24 months and urged that the sentence to be served concurrently instead of consecutively. Sentencing was scheduled to take place on 26 June 2023.

On 26 June 2023, District Judge Jill Tan sentenced Prema to another three years' imprisonment, and ordered the sentence to run consecutively, making Prema having to serve a total of 17 years' imprisonment for her offences against the maid. Tan pointed out during sentencing that Prema's conduct of removing surveillance footage of the maid abuse was a self-serving decision in response to the defense's plea that Prema did so out of a motherly instinct to protect her daughter, and agreed with the prosecution that increasing Prema's aggregate jail term from 14 years to 17 years was not manifestly excessive and necessary to highlight the grave heinousness of Prema's crimes.

== Trial of Kevin Chelvam ==
Kevin Chelvam, who was suspended from the police force since August 2016, faced five charges for his role in the abuse and death of Piang Ngaih Don.

Chelvam faced up to the maximum sentence of ten years' imprisonment for the most serious charge of voluntarily causing grievous hurt and up to three years' imprisonment for each of the other three charges of voluntarily causing harm, and both offences carry either a fine or caning. The fifth charge of providing false evidence during investigations also warrants a term of up to seven years of imprisonment.

On 20 July 2023, 44-year-old Kevin Chelvam, who intended to contest all five charges, was officially brought to trial at the Subordinate Courts of Singapore, with District Judge Teoh Ai Lin appointed to preside the hearing. Deputy Public Prosecutor (DPP) Stephanie Koh, who was in charge of Chelvam's trial, made her opening address on the same date. It is believed that both Gaiyathiri and Prema, who remained incarcerated, will come to court to testify during Chelvam's trial, which is expected to go on for ten days. Chelvam is currently out on bail of S$15,000. His trial was adjourned to 18 October 2023 for more evidence to be prepared. On 30 November 2023, CCTV footage of Piang's abuse, which also featured Chelvam allegedly standing at the side and not intervening, was presented in court. Additionally, both Prema and Gayathiri testified for the prosecution, but although Gayathiri admitted her husband had abused Piang previously, Prema deviated from her original statement and denied that Chelvam had mistreated Piang, and the prosecution is seeking to impeach her credibility as a witness.

On 27 May 2024, the first day when Chelvam took the stand, Chelvam reportedly admitted to grabbing Piang's hair and lifted her off the ground on one occasion, although he still had to face trial for the remaining four charges against him. The prosecution was set to cross-examine him as he took the stand to give his testimony.

On 10 April 2025, Chelvam was found guilty of all four charges of abusing the maid. He was namely convicted of one count each of voluntarily causing hurt, abetment of causing grievous hurt, giving false information to a police officer and causing evidence to disappear. Chelvam's next court hearing was scheduled on 17 July 2025, when the prosecution and defence would make submissions on sentence.

On 17 July 2025, Chelvam was sentenced to ten years in prison.

== Reactions ==
=== Government response ===
Upon Piang Ngaih Don's unfortunate death, the Ministry of Manpower (MOM) made a full insurance payout to her bereaved family members, which consisted of the full death benefit, repatriation cost and a special gratuity payment. Due to the aggravating circumstances of the case, the Attorney General of Singapore also personally directed the prosecutors to proceed with the highest and most serious criminal charge possible for both Prema and Gaiyathiri, who were arrested and investigated for murder.

When the investigations of the case were finally brought to light and the trial of Gaiyathiri started, Minister of Manpower Josephine Teo labelled the case as appalling and should never have happened. She also urged the public to alert the authorities should they detect any signs of abuse of foreign workers, and declared that there was no place for foreign maid abuse in Singapore. She also expressed that the government will look into possible measures to ensure the welfare of foreign domestic workers in Singapore.

Minister of Law K Shanmugam also expressed his abhorrence and condemnation towards the abuse and murder of Piang. He called it an evil that required a full force of law and education to keep it in check, and stated that none of the imaginable words could be used to sufficiently describe the extent of inhumanity and atrocity that happened to Piang, and the shocking conduct Gaiyathiri had displayed against Piang. He also said that in the case of former policeman Kevin Chelvam, it was necessary that even police officers who broke the law should also be prepared to face the full weight of the law for whatever crimes they commit.

=== Public response ===
At the wake of Gaiyathiri and Prema's arrest, many neighbours and the public were shocked over the duo's arrests. Similarly, Piang's family was also shocked to receive the news of her death. Many reporters had gathered at Bishan where the two alleged murderers of Piang were brought back to their matrimonial home to re-enact the crime. Many Singaporeans helped to donate money out of kindness to her family, including her then toddler-aged son Mung Lam Tuang, and the money was to be spent on Piang's son's education. A total of $30,000 was donated to her family, and after the foreign maid welfare groups helped collect the money, the Myanmar Embassy in Singapore began working with the authorities in Myanmar to safekeep the donation funds for the educational needs of Piang's son.

Piang's brother Pau Sian Mung, then a Catholic church volunteer and farmer, also received financial support by NGOs to travel from Myanmar to Singapore to reclaim his sister's body, and he expressed his gratitude to the kindness shown by both the Singaporeans and the volunteers. Pau stated he would bury his sister's body near their parents in Dimpi Village, and a cross was erected nearby the family's house to remember her. Pau was reportedly distraught to see his sister's body. Pau also said he would tell his nephew Mung how his mother died once the boy was old enough. In his own words, as given by a translator, Pau said, "I'm recording everything he (Mung) needs to know about his mum (Piang). I will teach her son to forgive and to be kind to others, and not to repay evil with evil."

A documentary was made by Al Jazeera that filmed the concept and plight of foreign maids in Singapore, and it was released in September 2016, two months after Piang Ngaih Don died. The documentary also covered the case of Piang's abuse and death, where the film producers also interviewed Piang's sister Ciang Lam Man who talked to them about her late sister.

Nearly five long years after the Bishan flat murder, the public interest was renewed when Gaiyathiri, the first of the three to stand trial, was brought to court to enter her plea of guilt. Many netizens expressed their anger over the case in social media for its exceptionally horrific background and condemned Gaiyathiri for her actions. On the other hand, many Singaporeans expressed their sympathy for Piang and her family, particularly her young son, who lost his mother at a young age. Since the trial of Gaiyathiri, many Singaporeans have donated money for Piang's bereaved family, which accumulated to a little more than S$200,000 by March 2021.

Not only that, there were concerns about the fact that Piang was not given any assistance by the hospital authorities or maid agency despite demonstrating warning signs of being abused, and there were calls for the community to do more to prevent possible maid abuse, as well as other employers to be more empathetic to their maids and realise the consequences of maid abuse. The case also cited the role played in Piang's death by the "bystander effect", which was first raised by the brutal murder of Kitty Genovese at Queens, New York in 1964, where it was allegedly witnessed by about 38 witnesses, who did not report the case or intervene to help the 28-year-old victim, which demonstrated striking similarities to Piang's case. In the aftermath of Genovese's case, her killer, a Manhattan-born African American named Winston Moseley, was later found guilty of her murder and sentenced to death, though his sentence was subsequently commuted to life imprisonment, and Moseley himself died in prison at age 81 after serving 52 years out of his sentence in 2016.

Due to Piang's case, there was also attention brought to the difficulty of other victims of maid abuse to report their employers, as the maids did not want to go through the criminal judicial process and the need to recount their experiences of abuse despite their desire to see their employers being brought to justice.

=== Implementation of new policies ===
In light of Gaiyathiri's trial, the Government of Singapore announced that to avoid similar crimes against maids from happening again, there will be a review of three areas, such as safeguards against abusive employers, the reporting system for doctors, and the involvement of community and partner organisations. The Centre for Domestic Employees (CDE) also implemented support services for maids to monitor the treatment faced from the employers.

On 5 April 2021, the Government of Singapore implemented a house visit scheme where people sent by the MOM will make visits to various flats all across Singapore that employed maids, which will allow them to monitor the welfare of the foreign maids, and there will be time to file a police report should anything abnormal arise. The scheme yielded first results where passports of domestic maids were illegally kept by the employers, and some employers and maids alike welcomed the changes made by the government.

The government also announced that there will be mandatory days off every month and enhanced medical check-ups for foreign maids in Singapore. Even the medical examinations for maids also included check-ups for BMIs and serious physical injuries to better equip doctors with the need to report to the police any possible cases of maid abuse if necessary.

Non-governmental organizations (NGO) in Singapore welcomed the changes, but they expressed at the same time in 2023 (roughly two years after the changes to the law) that there should be more measures the authorities should consider undertaking to end domestic worker abuse. Helping Hands for Migrant Workers (HHMW) founder Tin Maung Win described the abuse and murder of Piang at the hands of both Prema and Gayathiri as actions of cruelty that were "not a human mindset".

== See also ==
- Capital punishment in Singapore
- List of major crimes in Singapore
- Domestic worker
- Killing of Muawanatul Chasanah
