= Yang Jie =

Yang Jie is the name of:

- Yang Jie (director) (杨洁), television director and producer
- Yang Jie (volleyball) (杨婕), volleyball player
- Yang Jie (basketball) (杨洁), basketball player
- Yang Jie (diplomat) (杨杰), ambassador of China to Russia
- Yang Jie (murder victim) (杨婕), Chinese peidu mama murdered in Singapore
