= Jenny Tay =

- 郑珍妮
- Born: 1986 (age 39–40); Singapore
- Education: University of New South Wales (BCom)
- Occupation: Business executive Funeral director Entreupreneur
- Organization: Direct Funeral Services Direct Life Foundation Flower Story
- Spouse: Darren Cheng (m. 2015–present)
- Children: 3
- Father: Roland Tay

Jenny Tay (Chinese: 郑珍妮; pinyin: Zhèng Zhēn Ní; born 1986) is a Singaporean business executive and funeral industry professional. She is the managing director of Direct Funeral Services, a Singapore-based funeral services company founded by her father Roland Tay.

== Early life and education ==
Tay was born on 1986 in Singapore. She graduated from Nanyang Polytechnic and went on to obtain a Bachelor of Commerce degree, majoring in Marketing and Management, from the University of New South Wales in 2009.

== Career ==
Tay began her career in the advertising and marketing industry, working in client servicing and branding-related roles shortly after graduating from university. After four years in the industry, she entered the funeral business following a heart attack suffered by her father, undertaker Roland Tay.

In 2013, Tay took over as managing director of Direct Funeral Services alongside her then-boyfriend Darren Cheng, who joined the company after closing his counselling practice. Together, the couple rebranded and modernised the company, incorporating technology, and introducing initiatives focused on grief counselling, funeral pre-planning, and personalised memorial services. Tay has participated in public speaking engagements relating to changing societal perceptions surrounding death care professions, modernising funeral services for younger generations, entrepreneurship, and women leadership. Few years later, she went on to be involved in the development of affiliated floral ventures.

Tay was previously the Assistant Secretary at the Association of Funeral Directors Singapore, a NEA-recognized association that aims to uplift the services provided by funeral operators, and is now a Committee Member.

== Philanthropy ==
In 2015, Tay co-founded the Direct Life Foundation (DLF) with Darren Cheng as the charitable arm of Direct Funeral Services. The foundation conducts community outreach programmes supporting elderly individuals, bereaved families, and other vulnerable groups.

After taking over management of Direct Funeral Services, Tay has continued its longstanding practice of handling pro bono funeral services and sea burials for financially disadvantaged individuals, unclaimed deceased persons, and murder victims.

In 2023, Direct Funeral Services collaborated with The TENG Company on ''Music for Comfort'', a project exploring the use of music and storytelling as emotional support tools for grieving families.

== Awards and recognition ==
In 2016, Tay received the “Young Woman Achiever'' award by Her World for her contributions towards transforming perceptions of Singapore's funeral industry, modernising funeral care services, and women leadership. In the same year, she also received The Entrepreneur of the Year Award at the launch of the SME Talent Programme by then-Minister for Trade and Industry S. Iswaran.

Tay has also been featured in business and lifestyle publications discussing women leadership, innovation, and modernisation within traditional industries.

== Personal life ==
Tay is the daughter of Roland Tay, a prominent undertaker known for providing pro-bono funeral arrangements for the poor and families of murder victims.

Tay is married to Darren Cheng, chief executive officer of Direct Funeral Services. The couple has three children.

In 2015, Tay and Cheng attracted public attention for their coffin-themed wedding photography, which was intended to reflect their connection to the funeral industry and encourage conversations surrounding death and funeral culture.
