= Murder of Huang Na =

2004 child rape and murder in Singapore

Huang Na
- 黄娜
- Huang Na at an unknown date
- Born: 27 September 1996; Putian, Fujian, China
- Died: 10 October 2004 (aged 8); Pasir Panjang, Queenstown, Singapore
- Resting place: Houfeng Village, Hanjiang District, Putian, Fujian, China
- Education: Primary 2 (At the time of her death)
- Known for: Murder victim

Huang Na (Chinese: 黄娜; pinyin: Huáng Nà; 27 September 1996 – 10 October 2004) was an eight-year-old Chinese national residing in Pasir Panjang, Singapore, who disappeared on 10 October 2004. Her mother, the police and the community conducted a three-week-long nationwide search for her. After her body was found, thousands of Singaporeans attended her wake and funeral, giving bai jin (白金) (contributions towards funeral expenses) and gifts. In a high-profile 14-day trial, Took Leng How (Chinese: 卓良豪; Pe̍h-ōe-jī: Toh Liâng-hâu; pinyin: Zhuó Liángháo), a Malaysian vegetable packer at the estate's wholesale centre, was found guilty of murdering her. He was hanged on 3 November 2006 after an appeal and a request for presidential clemency failed.

== Background ==
Huang Na's father, Huang Qingrong (Chinese: 黄庆荣; pinyin: Huáng Qìngróng; Báⁿ-uā-ci̍: Ńg Ki̍ng-ṳ́ng ), and mother, Huang Shuying (Chinese: 黄淑英; Huáng Shūyīng; Ńg Se̤h-ing), were both born in 1973 to farming families in Putian city in Fujian, China. They met in 1995 and married soon after, as Shuying was pregnant with Huang Na. In 1996, Qingrong left China to seek better opportunities in Singapore and worked illegally as a vegetable packer at the Pasir Panjang Wholesale Centre. When Shuying found out that he was having extramarital affairs in Singapore, she divorced him and was given custody of Huang Na. She later married Zheng Wenhai (Chinese: 郑文海; pinyin: Zhèng Wénhǎi; Pe̍h-ōe-jī: Tēⁿ Bûn-hái), a Fujian businessman with whom she had lived for four years, and became pregnant with his child in early 2003.

In May 2003, Shuying also moved to Singapore as a peidu mama accompanying Huang Na, who was enrolled in Jin Tai Primary School at West Coast. They lived at the Pasir Panjang Wholesale Centre, where Shuying worked. People from the wholesale centre and her primary school described Huang Na as an intelligent, independent, sociable and active child. Huang Na became friends with Took Leng How, a vegetable packer at the wholesale centre. Born in Malaysia on 16 December 1981 as the second child of a close-knit Chinese Malaysian family of four, Took came to Singapore when he was 18, seeking better-paying jobs. At the wholesale centre, Took, who married a Chinese Indonesian woman and had a son, often played with Huang Na, bought her food and gave her rides on his motorcycle.

== Disappearance and reaction ==
Huang Na went missing on 10 October 2004, last being seen at a food court near the wholesale centre. She was wearing a blue denim jacket, Bermuda shorts, and was barefoot. From 7 a.m. to past midnight every day for three weeks, Shuying looked across the island for her daughter. The police, including a Criminal Investigation Department team, conducted an intensive search for the girl, and officers carried photographs of her while on their daily rounds. Volunteers formed search parties and Crime Library Singapore, a voluntary group dedicated to finding missing persons, distributed over 70,000 leaflets appealing for information. Local taxi company ComfortDelGro asked its cabbies to join in the search effort.

Two Singaporeans offered rewards of S$10,000 and S$5,000 for finding Huang Na, while the manager of an online design company set up a website to raise awareness and gather tips. The search even extended to Malaysia, with volunteers putting up posters in the nearby cities of Johor Bahru and Kuala Lumpur. Reportedly, at least 30 cabbies also placed posters of Huang Na on the rear windscreens and front seats of their vehicles. At least five coffee-shop owners in Johor Jaya, Taman Yew, and Skudai put up posters as well.

On 19 and 20 October, Singaporean police questioned Took as part of their investigation. He told the officers that three Chinese men kidnapped the girl. After questioning Took, police accompanied him home, then back to the police station for a polygraph test. On the way, they stopped at a restaurant along Pasir Panjang Road for a meal. While eating, Took said he needed to go to the toilet, used the opportunity to escape, took a taxi to Woodlands and sneaked across the Causeway to Malaysia. Singaporean police searched for him until he turned himself in on 30 October, confessing that he had accidentally strangled Huang Na during a game of hide-and-seek in a storeroom. The following day, Huang Na's body was found at Telok Blangah Hill Park, and Took was charged with her murder. Direct Singapore Funeral Services oversaw her funeral for free. Thousands attended Huang Na's wake and funeral; some gave bai jin and gifts, such as sweets, flowers and her favourite Hello Kitty merchandise. However, others also tried to make money from the girl's death by buying 4D lottery numbers associated with her. Others spread rumours that Shuying was having affairs and was greedy for donations.

== Fate of Took Leng How ==
Took Leng How

=== Trial at High Court ===
The 14-day trial of Took began on 11 July 2005, before Justice Lai Kew Chai in the High Court. Took was represented by prominent lawyer Subhas Anandan and two other lawyers, Sunil Sudheesan and Anand Nalachandran. The prosecution relied on 76 witnesses, a video in which Took re-enacted the murder, forensic evidence and an autopsy that found several bruises on Huang Na's head. Based on the evidence, the prosecution, led by Deputy Public Prosecutor Lawrence Ang, alleged that Took lured Huang Na to the storeroom, then stripped and sexually assaulted her. After smothering and stomping on her to ensure her death, he stored her body in nine layers of plastic bags stuffed into a sealed cardboard box. However, there was no conclusive proof that Huang Na had been sexually assaulted due to her body's high state of decomposition and the absence of semen in her vaginal area. The cause of her death was also determined inconclusive due to the possibility that she had died from a seizure or other cause unrelated to Took's alleged actions. The principal determination was that asphyxia was the cause of her death.

The defence relied on the claim of diminished responsibility. Psychiatrist R. Nagulendran argued that Took was schizophrenic, as some of his behaviour, such as frequently smiling to himself and talking of spirits, was inappropriate, and that he had no motive for the murder. Nagulendran also called Took's story about the three Chinese men a delusion. Anandan said that during his conversations with Took, the defendant would frequently start ranting about irrelevant things the lawyer could not understand. This resulted in his decision to keep Took from taking the stand. Instead, he allowed a psychiatrist to testify on Took's behalf. Took's police statements contained numerous discrepancies from the many different accounts of what happened to Huang Na. Took's low IQ of 76 was also noted by his defence. However, the prosecution's psychiatrist, G. Sathyadevan, insisted that Took did not suffer from any abnormality of mind.

On 27 August 2005, Justice Lai found Took guilty of murder and sentenced him to death. In his judgement, Justice Lai noted that Took had no history of mental abnormality, the behaviour the defence cited was "not necessarily abnormal", and the murder was "clearly the product of a cold and calculating mind". Justice Lai also said it was unnecessary to determine the motive for the murder or whether a sexual assault had taken place.

=== Execution ===
Took appealed the death sentence, but the Court of Appeal of Singapore upheld the decision in January 2006 by a 2–1 decision. Chief Justice Yong Pung How and Judge of Appeal Chao Hick Tin agreed with Justice Lai's decision to convict Took of murder, while High Court judge Kan Ting Chiu disagreed with the murder conviction due to the cause of death being inconclusive. In his dissenting judgement, Justice Kan felt that the appropriate conviction for Took should be voluntarily causing hurt and the maximum penalty Took should receive would be a year's imprisonment.

Later, Took's family and relatives decided to submit a clemency plea to President S. R. Nathan, which would allow Took's sentence to be commuted to life imprisonment if accepted. Eventually, they gathered 35,000 signatures from members of the public and submitted it to Nathan, who took eight months to consider before he decided to reject the plea in October 2006.

On the morning of 3 November 2006, 24-year-old Took Leng How was hanged in Changi Prison.

== Aftermath ==
=== Fate of Huang Na's family ===
Zheng and Shuying returned to Putian where their daughter Huang Na was buried in a tomb halfway up a mountain near their house. While alive, Huang Na had asked that her surname be changed to her stepfather's, so her altar tablet bore the name Zheng Na. The couple decided to focus on raising their remaining child, with Zheng planning to pursue business opportunities in Guangzhou or Shenzhen. In January 2007, three years after Huang Na's death, Jack Neo considered making a movie about the murder, but both families objected. A follow-up report in 2009 found that Shuying had given birth to another two children and was running a shoe distribution business in Taiwan.

=== Publications ===
The murder of Huang Na was considered a notable crime that shook Singapore. In July 2015, Singapore's national daily newspaper, The Straits Times, published an e-book titled Guilty As Charged: 25 Crimes That Have Shaken Singapore Since 1965, which included the Huang Na murder case. The book was the product of collaboration between the Singapore Police Force and the newspaper itself. The e-book was edited by ST News Associate editor Abdul Hafiz bin Abdul Samad. The paperback edition of the book was published and first hit the bookshelves in late June 2017. The paperback edition first entered the ST bestseller list on 8 August 2017, a month after its publication.

The case of Took Leng How was widely regarded as one of the notable cases taken by veteran lawyer Subhas Anandan, along with those of Leong Siew Chor (who killed and dismembered his lover in 2005), Anthony Ler (who hired a teen to murder his wife in 2001), and Tan Chor Jin (who robbed and gunned down a nightclub owner in 2006). Subhas recorded Took's case in his memoir The Best I Could, which was first published in 2009. In the memoir, Subhas firmly believed even after Took's execution that Took did not deserve to be sentenced to death, believed that his client was mentally ill, and that the murder conviction was wrong. Subhas also expressed that he was greatly disappointed that Took lost his appeal against the death sentence. In 2021, Subhas' son, Sujesh Anandan, in an article by the Singapore Academy of Law, said the case had affected Subhas very much.

Sujesh, who was Subhas's first and only child, told the reporters that when he was a teen, he witnessed his father being greatly affected by the appeal verdict of Took's case and took it badly. Sunil Sudheesan, one of the two lawyers assisting Subhas in defending Took Leng How, said that he and the other lawyer, Anand Nalachandran, were also shaken by the case like Subhas. After Took was executed, Subhas secretly attended Took's funeral together with two other lawyers who assisted him in Took's case.

Liz Porter, a crime writer from Australia, included Huang Na's case in her book Crime Scene Asia: When Forensic Evidence Becomes the Silent Witness. The book was about murder cases from Asia that were solved through forensic evidence; these recorded cases came from Asian countries like Singapore, Malaysia and Hong Kong.

In November 2023, the Chinese-language crime show Inside Crime Scene covered the case of Huang Na, as well as the unsolved murder of Goh Beng Choo, in the first episode of the show's second season.

== See also ==
- Capital punishment in Singapore
- List of solved missing person cases (post-2000)
