= Yishun triple murders =

2008 high-profile triple murder case in Singapore

- (From left) Zhang Meng, Feng Jianyu, and Yang Jie
- Location: Block 349, Yishun Avenue 11, Singapore
- Date: 18 September 2008; 18 years ago
- Attack type: Mass stabbing
- Victims: Zhang Meng, 41; Feng Jianyu, 17; Yang Jie, 36
- Perpetrators: Wang Zhijian, 42
- Motive: To seek revenge on mistreatment by the lover, and to silence potential witnesses

The Yishun triple murders case was a mass stabbing incident of three violent murders of three women in a rented flat in Yishun, Singapore in 2008. The perpetrator, Wang Zhijian, was the boyfriend of one of the two adult women living in the flat, and Wang, together with the victims, were from mainland China. Wang was alleged to have murdered both his girlfriend and her child, and tried to kill the other two tenants – also a mother-daughter pair – who lived in the next room. The daughter survived the attack but her mother was killed.

Wang faced three capital charges of murder and one charge of attempted murder (the attempted murder charge was stood down by the prosecution). He was convicted of one murder charge and two reduced culpable homicide charges and sentenced to death by the High Court of Singapore. Wang appealed against his death sentence but the Court of Appeal of Singapore dismissed Wang's appeal and convicted him of two more charges of murder after the simultaneous hearing of the prosecution's appeal against Wang's two culpable homicide charges.

== Murders ==
=== Discovery and arrest ===
On 19 September 2008, at around 12.50 am, police received a report that a woman had fallen from one of the flats and her body was found lying motionless on the ground floor nearby the void deck of a HDB block in Yishun. A unit from Ang Mo Kio Police Division arrived at the scene to investigate the fall.

A resident of the area told police that on the night itself when the woman's body was found, he heard voices of a few women, which seemed like an argument of sorts. At around midnight, the man heard the sound of furniture being thrown, and a man shouting, as though he was chopping something. He tried to look into one of the units where the sounds came from but the lights were off. The women's cries slowly diminished, until he heard a 'thud' accompanied with a scream, which came from the woman who fell to her death. Another witness stated that he saw some people driving away from the void deck, and he was not sure if these men were related to the death of the woman.

A search by the police in the HDB block led to a discovery of blood stains on the door of a flat on the sixth floor. The police knocked the door but a male occupant refused to open the door. The Singapore Civil Defence Force was called in to force an entry into the flat. On entering the unit, the police found the male occupant and three women, one adult and two teenagers, who were slashed and stabbed in a kitchen toilet and one of the bedrooms. One of the teenagers, who was found in the toilet, was found to be alive when the police discovered her and was immediately taken to Tan Tock Seng Hospital for treatment. The other two women were found dead inside the bedroom, being stabbed a total of 98 times. The male suspect, whose fingers were injured, was also arrested by the police; the man did not resist capture. The flat was also being searched by police to collect evidence. The suspect and his victims were said to be from Mainland China.

Neighbours were shocked to hear about the alleged murders committed by the suspect, who they said was the boyfriend of one of the tenants. Residents told newspapers and police that throughout the past two weeks before the murders, there had been sounds of agitated arguments between the suspect and his girlfriend coming from the unit a few times each week, and the night before the crimes, the couple were also arguing. The case was a shock to the nation and was regarded as the worst murder case ever committed in Singapore for at least the last 15 years.

=== Investigations and charges ===
The police investigations, now led by Assistant Superintendent of Police (ASP) Jason Lim, had found that there were four possible murder weapons stained with the blood of the victims from the flat, which consisted of a serrated knife, a chopper, a knife and a metal spatula. The three deceased victims were identified as a 41-year-old peidu mama called Zhang Meng, Zhang's 17-year-old daughter Feng Jianyu and Zhang's 36-year-old flatmate and fellow peidu mama Yang Jie (who fell to her death). The survivor was Yang Jie's 15-year-old daughter, who was reportedly also Feng's classmate from the same school. (Note: However, Feng and the survivor were shown to be enrolled to different schools. It is not known if it is an error by the reporters or not.) The survivor, being a minor below 16 years old, was not named in the media in accordance to Singapore law and the girl's published photographs were censored to not publicly reveal her true facial appearance, (Note: However, later reports reported her name as "Li Meilin" (Chinese: 李美霖; pinyin: lǐ měilín). It is not known if it was an alias or her real name, given she was not supposed to be identified publicly due to her age under Singapore law.) although her face was revealed in an Evangel Family Church page.

A day after his arrest, the suspect, Zhang Meng's 42-year-old boyfriend Wang Zhijian, was charged with murder for the death of Zhang Meng. Wang potentially faces the mandatory death sentence if he was found guilty of murder under the laws of Singapore. Later, on 4 October 2008, Wang was brought back to court again, where the prosecution additionally charged him with two more counts of murder for the deaths of Yang and Feng, and one count of attempted murder for attacking Yang's daughter. The attempted murder charge for the grievous attack conducted on Li was later stood down and the prosecution proceeded with the triple murder charges against Wang for the murders of Zhang, Feng and Yang.

Many relatives of the victims, including Zhang's sister and brother-in-law and Yang's elder sister and mother, came all the way from China to identify their bodies for funeral preparations after the completion of the forensic pathologist's autopsies of the three dead women. Zhang's family, who arranged for the cremation of Zhang and Feng's corpses on 26 September 2008, reportedly stated that it was no longer important to know what will be the sentence the courts could give to the alleged killer, given that the lives are already lost and cannot be revived. Yang's daughter was reportedly stable at the time of a news report dated 24 September 2008. Another report also revealed that the teenage girl's school's vice principal and three of the girl's classmates also went to visit the girl under police supervision to help her cope with the difficult times. It was also confirmed that the survivor will come to court to testify once the trial of Wang started.

=== Response of the Chinese Embassy in Singapore ===
Upon receiving news of the arrest of Wang and the three alleged murders of Chinese women occurring in Yishun, the Chinese Embassy in Singapore became concerned and urged the local authorities to investigate in the case as quickly as possible to make sure that justice was served and the killer be severely punished. They also sent representatives to Tan Tock Seng Hospital to meet up with the surviving teenager and her loved ones to help them cope with their loss while getting updates on the situation.

=== Reactions of the public in Singapore ===
The murders of the three Chinese nationals in Yishun, which also involved the deaths of two study mamas (a local term for mothers who accompany their children who are studying overseas), had also caused ripples among the online Chinese community and became one of the most frequently discussed topics in the online Chinese forums. Many of the Chinese nationals, particularly study mamas, were shocked over the case and talked about it frequently among themselves. The netizens from China expressed their sadness over the triple deaths and called for all Chinese nationals in Singapore to help the sole survivor of the murders.

The case also prompted some study mamas to speak up about their difficult lives in Singapore and their concern over how the case will impact on their lives. Prior to the murders, it was known that during their children's education in Singapore, study mamas spent their time in Singapore on long social visit passes and could not apply for a work permit during their first year in Singapore, which made their lives much harder and it was made worse by the discrimination these women faced for alleged or perceived involvement in affairs with married men and prostitution, and the restriction on their avenues for employment (they are not allowed to work in coffee shops, bars and massage spas).

One of these study mamas, a 45-year-old Madam Chen, stated that as a cleaner who helped cleaning other people's homes in Singapore, she originally worked eight jobs a week before the murders, and these dropped to five after the murders occurred, due to increased fear and mistrust towards Chinese nationals as a result of the trouble these people got into. Madam Chen, who was a native of Tianjin and had a teenage son studying in Singapore since 2005, stated that the case will make it worse for her tough life in Singapore, given that she was already struggling to earn a living for both herself and her son, then aged 16 at the time of the murders.

Another study mama, Madam Hu Xiu Ling, aged 36, stated that she was saddened whenever there were any negative reports about Chinese study mamas in Singapore. She expressed that she hoped the government of Singapore would not tighten the rules imposed on the study mamas in light of the Yishun murders, and did not want to have more difficulty in finding jobs in Singapore. Madam Hu stated that she, as well as all other study mamas, only wanted their children to have a good education in Singapore and they merely craved for a simple life in the country.

== Background ==
=== The relationship between Wang Zhijian and Zhang Meng ===
Born in 1966, Wang Zhijian (Chinese: 王志健; Pinyin: wáng zhìjiàn) came from Tianjin, China. He grew up together with at least one brother named Zhijie (his son's paternal uncle) in his family and later worked at a port as a supervisor. Wang went on to marry an unnamed woman, with whom he fathered a son. The marriage, however, did not work out and eventually, in 2004, Wang divorced his wife due to "incompatible differences", and the woman subsequently took custody of their son. Meanwhile, in 1996, when he went to a brokerage firm to trade in stocks, he first met one of the Yishun murder victims Zhang Meng.

Zhang Meng (Chinese: 张孟; Pinyin: zhāng mèng), a university graduate and shipping company employee, was born on 13 November 1966. Zhang was also a native of Tianjin, China who was then married to policeman Feng Jinqiang when she first met Wang in 1996. Zhang, who gave birth to her daughter Feng Jianyu (Chinese: 冯建宇; Pinyin: féng jiànyǚ) on 23 August 1991 five years before, barely had any contact with Wang, who was introduced to her by Wang's colleague despite that they came from the same province. It was not until 2005, a year after Wang's divorce, when Zhang, in a surprising twist of events, contacted Wang and met up with him a second time in a coffee house on her request. During their meeting, Wang openly let out his depressed feelings about his divorce and former spouse. After this fateful meeting, both Wang and Zhang met each other for a date once a week, a routine that would increase to twice a week. The couple later had their first sexual encounter in March 2006.

In June 2006, for unknown reasons, Zhang confessed to Wang that she was actually a married mother. Wang had initially contemplated breaking up with her, and even suspected that she had other lovers, but Zhang told him that she had fallen for him the first time they met and wanted to be together with him for life. As a way to prove her feelings for him, Zhang used her blood to write the words in Chinese, "I love Wang Zhi" before Wang himself continued writing, "...jian, I want to marry him". Wang even went on to write in his blood that he will love Zhang until the day he die to express his feelings for Zhang, who continued the illicit relationship with the man. Wang had even tattooed Zhang's face onto his body to express the validity of his feelings for the woman.

In November 2006, Zhang's husband Feng Jinqiang discovered the affair and called Wang to meet up with him. Upon Wang's arrival, Feng asked his wife to choose between himself and Wang, and Zhang picked the latter. Zhang's family, having heard about the affair also, began to harass Wang. There are instances where Zhang' family members, notably Zhang's younger brother, sister and brother-in-law, went to Wang's workplace to harass him, as well as issued Wang with beatings and death threats. This went too far for Wang, who decided to have an early retirement from his job, and received 400,000 yuan (or RMB 400,000; then $81,732.92 in SGD currency). The couple even fled from Tianjin to Chengdu to escape the harassment before Zhang returned to her daughter during Chinese New Year. A quarter of Wang's retirement funds were later spent on expensive meals and branded clothes on Zhang, who filed for divorce in 2007.

Soon after their divorce, Feng was diagnosed with a stroke. Zhang decided to remain by Feng's side and take care of him. Zhang and Wang broke up for four months after this event, and after which, together with her child, Zhang moved away from Feng to live with Wang, thus restoring their relationship. According to Wang, he tried to treat the girl nicely due to him loving her mother but Feng Jianyu, due to her blaming him for her family's break-up, would not accept him and treated him with dislike.

Eventually, Zhang decided to send Feng to Switzerland for a better education, but she failed to find any vacancy for her daughter, hence she turned her attention to Singapore. Feng's enrollment was accepted by Northview Secondary School and thus, Zhang became a peidu mama and moved into Singapore with her daughter in December 2007. According to a student who knew and befriended Feng since her time in Singapore, she described the 17-year-old Secondary Two student as a cheerful and bright individual. She even sported top grades in school and became the first in her class despite not being proficient in her English language skills (in Singapore's education system, all subjects, except for Mother Tongue, were taught in English), which attracted teasing and bullying from some students in her school.

Aside from this, Zhang and Wang separated once again in March 2008, and the latter moved house. But later in that same month, Zhang returned to China during her daughter's school holidays, and she managed to trace Wang's whereabouts and they reunited a second time. On Zhang's request, Wang agreed to go to Singapore for the first time in July 2008.

=== Yang Jie and her daughter ===
Yang Jie (Chinese: 杨婕; Pinyin: yáng jié), born on 3 April 1972, grew up in Shenyang, Liaoning, Northeast China, and had married twice prior to her death in Singapore.

Yang was first married to a taxi driver named Li Wenge (Chinese: 李文革; Pinyin: lǐ wéngé) in 1992, and gave birth to a daughter on 10 February 1993. When the daughter was eight months old, Yang divorced her husband and took custody of the child, whom she entrusted to her mother's care before she married another man, Chen Jun (Chinese: 陈军; Pinyin: chén jūn). Yang was said to have moved to Dalian to live with Chen and later gave birth to another girl in 1999 or 2000, while her first child remained in Shenyang.

Yang later decided to send her elder daughter to Singapore for a better education. To afford the education fees, Yang resigned from her property agent job and even sold her house to allow her elder child to move to Singapore. Later, both Yang and her elder daughter moved into Singapore together, while her husband remained in China with the other daughter. Yang's daughter studied at Northland Secondary School, and befriended her classmate Feng. Feng and her mother, Zhang Meng, shared the same rental flat as her and her mother. Like Feng, Yang Jie's daughter was also considered a good student with good grades in school when she first arrived in Singapore, and had once became one of the top four scorers in class.

Initial reports had wrongly reported that Yang was the lover of Wang Zhijian, as supplied by some of the rumours spread by different witnesses about the identity of Wang's girlfriend. Yang's mother Madam Zhang Wei (unrelated to Zhang Meng), together with Yang's acquaintances and second husband, had earlier denied in subsequent news reports that Yang was Wang's girlfriend or acquaintance.

== Wang's account to the police ==
=== Events before the crime ===
According to Wang in his police statements, he said that during the three trips he made to Singapore on social visit passes from July 2008 until 19 September 2008 when he killed Zhang, Yang and Feng, he was experiencing extreme abuse and humiliation while living together with Zhang in her rental flat, which she shared with Feng, Yang and her daughter.

Wang told the interrogating officer Jason Lim in his statements that he used up his cash on expensive food for his girlfriend and Feng, and even helped them to do the laundry and cooking. Wang also said Zhang forced him to stay in her bedroom naked because Zhang forbid him to exit the room whenever her daughter and their two tenants were around as Feng disliked Wang. Since Zhang's bedroom did not have a toilet, Wang had to carry out his bowel movements in plastic bags and newspapers. He was also made to eat the leftovers of the food he cooked for Zhang and Feng and not allowed to share the table with them. Zhang even went as far as to demand Wang to have sex with her twice or thrice a day during his time in Singapore. The accused man claimed he did not dare to resist Zhang because he was fearful she would restrict him with stricter rules. Wang said that Zhang might also bite him, like she did in the past whenever the couple argued. Aside from his issues with Zhang, Wang also claimed that during the time he spent in Singapore, he tried to dissipate Feng's dislike of him by giving her gifts and treating her nicely, but his efforts to win Feng over did not come to fruition.

When he first arrived in Singapore in July 2008, Wang said within four days, he had spent all of his 2,800 yuan mostly on food for Zhang. Wang was forced to move in to live with his elderly mother as a result of a lot of his savings spent to satisfy Zhang's needs and wants. After Wang returned to Tianjin, she contacted him to say she could help him find a job through her friends in Singapore. When Wang returned to Singapore for a second trip on 3 August 2008, Wang was introduced to several agents who gave him job offers, but these were accompanied with charges. Zhang refused to help him pay on his behalf, claiming that she did not have sufficient cash. The couple argued violently before Wang returned to China on 2 September.

Sometime later, Zhang contacted him, informing him that she would be transferring Feng to Raffles Girls' School and asked for his help to arrange the school transfer and to help her move to a new flat near the school. Wang agreed, and he withdrew 7,000 yuan from his account (which was all left of his personal savings). After he arrived on 9 September 2008, Wang had used up around 2,000 yuan within 5 days, including S$120 for two pieces of crabs, which he cooked and prepared for Zhang and her daughter. Wang was supposed to eat two leftover parts of the crabs, but these were eventually given to Feng who wanted to have them for breakfast.

On 18 September, at about 8 pm, Zhang came into her bedroom and told Wang that Feng and herself wanted to eat another crab meal. Wang, who then did not have enough money left on him, told Lim that he reminded Zhang that they just ate it merely a week ago and informed her that it cost more than $100 for every crab meal, and he wanted to save up the remaining cash. After which, the couple argued for nearly an hour. Wang said to the police that Zhang hurled humiliating vulgarities at him and called him a poor fellow, and that he was produced by donkeys and dogs, which infuriated him.

=== The killings (Wang's account) ===
After the argument, Zhang went to bed at about 9 pm. Wang, who was naked, shared the same bed but could not fall asleep. ASP Lim, who recorded Wang's statements, heard Wang described how angered he was to the point of feeling shortness of breath and his body trembling, and that he was "seeing red" while the blood kept rushing through his head and his mind was blank. Wang kept mulling over how "wicked" his girlfriend was and how she kept spending his money like water and her unfaithfulness. The mulling went on about an hour before the 42-year-old went into the kitchen and remained there for some time, supposedly to calm himself down. But in the kitchen, Wang laid his hands on a serrated-edged knife. He brought it along with him into Zhang's bedroom. It was there, Wang used the knife to kill his 41-year-old lover Zhang Meng.

Wang first positioned himself over his sleeping girlfriend's naked body and began to stab Zhang repeatedly. Zhang was said to have been awakened from her sleep and shrieked in pain while trying to sit up. Despite so, Wang relentlessly stabbed her until she died from her wounds; Wang claimed he cannot recall how many times he stabbed his girlfriend.

While he was in the frenzied process of stabbing Zhang, Feng Jianyu, then 17 years old, was awakened by the sounds of stabbing while she was sleeping in the living room, which prompted her to open her mother's bedroom door. This would be the final, and fatal mistake Feng would make in the last moments of her life, as Wang, who saw her witnessing him killing her mother, went over to repeatedly stab Feng to death. Wang told ASP Lim that when he saw the girl, he initially did not recognise her and his only thought was to kill "the person standing in the doorway", and he only realised that this person was Feng when he simmered down and looked at her body, which slumped down next to her mother's. The autopsy reports revealed in court that among the total of 98 knife wounds found on both Feng and Zhang's corpses, 16 of them were potentially fatal.

Wang claimed that, right after killing Feng, the door of the bedroom next door, then occupied by Yang Jie and her daughter, opened. Wang then also witnessed two people standing there. He rushed into the bedroom and attacked them. He stated that he attacked and stabbed the younger of the two tenants (Yang Jie's daughter) inside the room while the older tenant (Yang) managed to escape the room. He claimed that when he ended the stabbing and went to look for Yang, he could not find her after searching everywhere in the flat, leading to him returning to finish off the girl, who was no longer inside the bedroom.

Wang said that he located the girl inside the kitchen toilet, leading to him taking a third knife to cut down the toilet's sliding door to enter and attack the girl (who survived the attack). Wang ended off his account by saying that he went to look out of the window and saw Yang's body on the ground floor, leading to him deciding to close the kitchen window and quickly prepare to flee the flat (which he failed to when the police arrived). These statements were read out by the prosecution in Wang Zhijian's murder trial, which first started on 22 November 2011 in the High Court of Singapore, with the case heard by High Court judge Chan Seng Onn.

== High Court sentencing ==
=== The prosecution's case ===
At the start of the trial on 22 November 2011, the prosecution, led by Deputy Public Prosecutor (DPP) Hay Hung Chun, began to present its case to the courts. In their case, the lengthy timeline of Wang's relationship with Zhang and the events leading up to the murders were similar to Wang's account of what happened. The details of the murders of Zhang and Feng were also consistent with Wang's police statements. However, when it comes to the circumstances of Yang Jie's death and attempted murder of her daughter, it was a different story.

As the prosecution presented their case from November to December 2011, they argued that Wang's account of how he attacked Yang and her daughter were not true – instead, right after murdering Zhang and Feng, Wang actually went into the kitchen to take a new weapon – a chopper – before proceeding to the bedroom to silence Yang and her daughter for fear that they might become witnesses of his crime.

One of the prosecution's expert witnesses, Senior Consultant Forensic Scientist Dr Lim Chin Chin of the Health Sciences Authority (HSA), had submitted to the court a reconstruction report that reconstructed the crime scene. According to the report, there were bloodstains containing Wang's, Zhang's and Feng's DNA (Wang by then had also injured his fingers while killing Zhang and Feng) found on the doorknob leading to the bedroom occupied by Yang and her daughter, which indicated that Wang was the one who opened the door to enter the room to attack the mother-daughter pair. Furthermore, the serrated knife, which was found under the mattress of Zhang's bed, did not have Yang's or her daughter's DNA, further proving that Wang did not use the serrated knife to attack the other two tenants of the flat.

The reconstruction report also shed more light to Wang's actions after he killed Zhang and Feng: Wang had gone into the rental flat's third empty bedroom to look for something in the wardrobe before heading to the kitchen. The bloodstained metal spatula, which had the DNA of Wang, Zhang and Feng, was found inside the kitchen's washing machine; it meant that Wang had indeed went inside the kitchen to look for new murder weapons as what the prosecution contended, and Wang could have realised the metal spatula was not a good enough weapon to kill, explaining why the spatula was thrown into the washing machine.

Regarding the way of how Yang Jie died, the reconstruction report also made a finding that disputed Wang's account and supported the prosecution's case. There were smudges of blood found on the exterior wall outside the kitchen window nearby the bamboo poles embedded on the same wall. These were tested and found to match the DNA of Yang. Besides, according to the autopsy reports of forensic pathologist Dr Wee Keng Poh of the HSA, other than the fatal head and hip injuries sustained by Yang during her fall of death, there were numerous severe, deep cuts on the exterior side of Yang's right and left fingers, while the inner fingers showed deep bruises.

The above evidence indicated that Yang must have climbed out of the kitchen window and gripped tightly to the bamboo poles while she was suspended in mid-air outside the flat, and the killer Wang used the chopper to hack at Yang's fingers, leading to the then-36-year-old woman losing her grip and falling to her death. This proven that Wang had indeed intentionally killed Yang unlike the numerous denials he made over his involvement in Yang's death. The absence of Yang's DNA inside the flat from the numerous mixtures of the other victims' blood found inside the flat and from the other identified murder weapons further supported the notion that Yang's fingers were not slashed inside the flat even if Wang indeed attacked Yang in the flat before her death.

Furthermore, the prosecution also charged that Wang was actually in full control of his actions and had not lost his self-control as what he contended in his account. When Wang took the stand in April 2012 and claimed in his court testimony that he did not remember how he attacked the victims and that his mind had gone blank by excessive rage, the prosecution put it to him that he had remembered and clearly knew what he was doing and had prepared to flee, reminding him that he remembered to take a bath to wash the blood, he had also changed his clothes, applied first aid on his injured hands, packed his bag and passport, and wore his footwear.

Wang disagreed, saying that if he really did not lose his self control, he would not have neglected to bring some of his other belongings kept in the wardrobe and bedroom. When cross-examined by DPP Hay's colleague Mohamed Faizal Md Abdul Kadir, Wang also claimed that he did not remember wearing his shoes and socks after the murder. He also said he cannot remember making his statements to the police. He would later on keep saying he did not remember during the days he took the stand and faced the cross-examination from the prosecution, and he insisted that he did not kill Yang even though he claimed that he did not remember the events that took place.

=== Testimony of Yang's daughter ===
Yang's teenage daughter, then 18 years old and pending her GCE O-level results, took the stand to testify against Wang. By then, some newspapers gave her the alias "Grace" to protect her true identity.

Grace testified that when Wang attacked Zhang and Feng, she was awakened from her sleep by sounds of heavy breathing, as though someone was being suffocated. Grace also claimed she overheard Feng shouting something in Mandarin, and also some objects falling. Grace and her mother, who was also awakened by the sounds, discussed on should they call the police or not.

Then, the door suddenly swung open and Wang appeared. While Yang managed to escape the room amidst the horror, Wang cornered Grace and slashed at her with the chopper and she raised her arms to defend herself from the chopper. After this attack, Grace told the court, that Wang asked her to keep quiet and he then left the room to look for her mother. Before she could close the door, Wang appeared again to attack Grace. He approached her and continued to use the chopper on her. Yang's daughter kicked him once and it caused Wang to lose his balance and fall, giving her the chance to escape the bedroom and hide in the kitchen toilet.

After some moments, Wang hacked at the toilet's door using both the chopper and a third knife until it collapsed, allowing Wang to enter the toilet to slash at Grace's head, face and neck until she collapsed onto the floor. When Wang stopped the attack and left her, the girl muttered the words, "God, let me die." Having heard her, Wang returned and stabbed her again, this time onto the girl's back, right ear and back of the neck. The lengthy attack left the girl with 41 knife injuries on her face, jaw, and right ear. Not only was Grace's right ear nearly torn off, she also lost her right eye to the attack; the doctors operating on her had to remove the damaged eyeball to prevent her losing her eyesight from the remaining left eye. They later replaced the removed right eyeball with a prosthetic eyeball. The chopper and kitchen knife Wang used on Grace were confirmed to have her DNA on them.

After Grace finished her testimony in court on 22 November 2011, Wang, who by then denied the murder charges, told his lawyers Kelvin Lim and Jason Dendroff to help him tell the girl that he was sorry for what he did.

=== Psychiatric reports ===
The High Court also received psychiatric reports from both the prosecution and the defence. The defence's psychiatric expert, Dr Tommy Tan, presented his report first in April 2012.

According to Dr Tan, who examined Wang two years after the incident, he stated that Wang qualified for a defence of diminished responsibility against all the three murder charges against him. He diagnosed Wang was suffering from an adjustment disorder, which was suggestive of a mild or prolonged depressed mood. The disorder resulted from the frequent harassment Wang experienced from Zhang's family members, the loss of both his employment and retirement funds (the latter which due to Zhang's endless spending), the extreme humiliation and bizarre mistreatment Wang faced and experienced in Zhang's flat during his time in Singapore, and the helplessness he felt due to his lack of familiarity in a foreign land like Singapore and the issues of his relationship with Zhang. Furthermore, Dr Tan also added that patients with adjustment disorders are known to be liable to outbursts of violence, like in Wang's case, which led to him committing the murders.

Dr Tan referred to a report known as the "MacArthur Study" by John Monahan to support his case. The MacArthur Study, which tested patients suffering from separate categories of major mental disorders and from other mental disorders (adjustment disorder fell within the category of other mental disorders). The results of the MacArthur study suggested that the rate of prevalence of violence for patients diagnosed with other mental disorders was higher than those diagnosed with major mental disorders, and the difference in the statistics was significant. When asked why Wang cannot recall his crimes even though he gave detailed statements, Dr Tan answered that Wang may have unconsciously forgotten this part of memory, as stimulated by the trauma of killing his loved one, and added that many offenders similar to Wang's case also had such memory losses though Wang would have known what he was doing. He conceded that there is no study conducted on such a phenomenon, but he stated that awareness does not equate to thinking.

The prosecution's psychiatric expert was Dr Kenneth Koh, a consultant psychiatrist from the Institute of Mental Health (IMH) who examined Wang during his psychiatric remand right after he was first charged in court. Dr Koh testified for the prosecution in May 2012 that Wang was not suffering from impairment of his mental faculties when killing Zhang, Feng and Yang, though he did agree that Wang was indeed suffering from an adjustment disorder and that when it comes to extreme anger, there would be some loss of self-control. According to Dr Koh, he said, "The severity of his mood symptoms, however, were insufficient to warrant a diagnosis of a major depressive disorder at the time of the alleged offences." It meant that Wang's condition was not sufficiently so to qualify him for a defence of diminished responsibility, since he still has a significant degree of self-control within him. He said that Wang was able to calmly surrender to the police and hide the murder weapons, as well as smoothly conversing with the psychiatrist during the psychiatric assessment sessions with him, which showed he was still mentally stable despite the condition he suffered from.

Dr Koh, who spoke to Grace, Zhang's acquaintance and Wang's brother Wang Zhijie, also made out that Wang did not have a past or recent history of psychiatric illnesses, and he still went jogging during the last ten days in Singapore before the murders, went to the market with Zhang daily and also engaged in sexual intercourse with her on several occasions during the final days leading up to the murders, as well as enjoying his conversation and time with Zhang despite the mistreatment he faced, which were corroborated by Grace, who also told the court that she rarely saw Wang walking around the flat and how Wang kept his head down or never make eye contact with her and her mother, much less starting a conversation with them. The trial was adjourned to August 2012 for closing submissions from both the prosecution and defence.

Should Wang be successful in proving his defence of diminished responsibility, he would be convicted of culpable homicide not amounting to murder, and faced the maximum term of life imprisonment or up to a fixed term of 10 years' imprisonment, with a possible concurrent fine or caning.

=== Assault incident in prison ===
In July 2012, while awaiting the verdict for the Yishun murders, Wang had assaulted another inmate while in jail. The injured inmate was Ong Seng Chuen, a 48-year-old Singaporean who was formerly on the run for 21 years for a 1989 robbery and murder of coffee shop owner Ling Ha Hiang before he surrendered in 2010. Ong, who received a sentence of six years' imprisonment and 12 strokes of the cane for a reduced charge of culpable homicide and robbery, had accidentally bumped into Wang and apologised, but was beaten up by Wang later.

According to a report detailing Ong's sentencing, which took place a month after the incident, Ong did not fight back as he wanted to maintain good behaviour in prison so as to be granted an early release from prison on parole so he can have an early reunion with his girlfriend and son. It is unknown why Wang assaulted Ong even though the latter had apologised for bumping into him.

=== Judgement ===
On 30 November 2012, four months after the prosecution and defence made their respective closing submissions, Justice Chan Seng Onn delivered his judgement at the final day of the Yishun triple murder trial.

Justice Chan found that Wang was indeed suffering from diminished responsibility when he murdered Zhang, which was largely attributed to the anger Wang increasingly felt from the humiliating mistreatment by Zhang, which finally led to Wang losing control and went to stab Zhang multiple times after that final argument, and his loss of self-control was also exacerbated by the adjustment disorder suffered by Wang, to which the judge accepted this aspect of the evidence of the defence's psychiatrist Dr Tan. As such, he found Wang guilty of culpable homicide for Zhang's death.

Secondly, turning to the death of Feng, Justice Chan found that Feng had unfortunately entered the room when Wang was stabbing Zhang to death. Wang had earlier in his statements and testimony kept referring to Feng as "the person standing in the doorway" and also consistently stated that he did not recognise that the second person he killed was Feng until he regained his control and stopped killing. Justice Chan inferred from the similar nature of the attacks on Zhang and Feng, in terms of type, location and number of wounds, and thus accepted that Wang indeed did not recognise Feng when he killed her. Since Wang was still in a state of frenzy and loss of self-control while killing Feng, the judge considered the deaths of both Zhang and Feng as a single transaction and thus found Wang guilty of culpable homicide for Feng's death as well.

Turning to the case of Yang however, Justice Chan found that Wang was not suffering from diminished responsibility when he murdered Yang. The longer series of events occurring after the deaths of Zhang and Feng – including telling Grace to not run and looking for new murder weapons in the kitchen – in which Wang would have fully recovered his self-control and mental faculties instead of being in a continued loss of self-control. The judge also said, by killing Zhang, the one person who had caused him a lot of stress, humiliation and suffering, Wang would have already released all the bottled-up anger within him. As such, he found Wang guilty of murder for Yang's death under Section 300(a) of the Penal Code and sentenced him to death by hanging.

== Court of Appeal sentencing ==
After his conviction by the High Court, Wang filed an appeal against the conviction and death sentence for Yang's murder while the prosecution appealed. The appeals were first heard on 4 September 2013 and 26 February 2014 before Judges of Appeal Chao Hick Tin, Andrew Phang and V K Rajah.

With the appointment of Justice Rajah as the Attorney-General of Singapore on 25 June 2014, the appeals had to be reheard on 30 September 2014 before Justice Chao, Justice Phang and High Court judge Tay Yong Kwang, where judgment was reserved. On 28 November 2014, the Court of Appeal dismissed Wang's appeal while allowing the prosecution's appeal. Wang was found guilty of murder for the deaths of both Zhang and Feng as well.

The Court of Appeal, in the case of Yang's death, they were largely in agreement with the original trial judge Chan Seng Onn's findings in the case of Yang's murder, stating that the defence of diminished responsibility did not come to play in Yang's death as what Justice Chan found, and that Wang had clearly intended to cause Yang's death by using the chopper to repeatedly chop her fingers and leave her to fall to her death.

Regarding the deaths of Zhang and Feng, the three judges stated that they were not satisfied that Wang lost his self-control due to his adjustment disorder, hence rejecting the defence of diminished responsibility for Zhang's and Feng's deaths. They said that the MacArthur Study referred to by Dr Tommy Tan did not support his psychiatric report because the report had many other mental illnesses other than adjustment disorders being included in the same category that led to larger outbursts of violence than major psychiatric disorders, and that adjustment disorders usually involved reactive or mild outbursts of violence, in contrast to the extreme brutality and violence demonstrated by Wang in the Yishun murders case.

Instead, the three judges said that Wang had killed Zhang out of massive, uncontrollable anger so that she will never appear again in his life, as a result of the multiple humiliation and mistreatment he suffered in her hands. Turning to Feng, he wanted to silence her because she witnessed her mother's murder. As such, they convicted Wang of the original two charges of murder for Zhang and Feng, and sentenced him to death for these two murders as well, while at the same timing upholding Wang's conviction and death sentence for Yang's murder.

Since then, Wang had been executed on 20 May 2016 along with Kho Jabing, a Malaysian national who was also executed for murder. Wang was not among the 50 inmates remaining alive on Singapore's death row in August 2023, and only three of these prisoners were found guilty of murder (namely Iskandar Rahmat, Ahmed Salim and Teo Ghim Heng, all three of which were executed by April 16, 2025) while the remaining 47 were convicted of drug trafficking.

== Fate of Yang Jie's daughter ==
Yang Jie's daughter Grace alone remained in Singapore to continue her education. It was reported that she was supporting herself with her mother's savings of $10,000 and the donations from members of the public.

The trauma of the attack led to the girl to become afraid of the dark. Two weeks after the murders, on 2 October 2008, Grace, while still recuperating from her injuries, was discharged from the hospital to attend her mother's funeral, which was generously held for free by undertaker Roland Tay due to the family's unstable financial situation. At Mandai Crematorium, many relatives of Yang Jie, including Yang's then 63-year-old mother Zhang Wei, Yang's elder sister, Yang's ex-husband Li Wenge and Yang's second husband Chen Jun, attended the funeral. According to news reports, the teenager remained calm throughout the funeral, for which the composure broke when her mother's coffin was taken into the furnace for cremation.

Yang's daughter, who was interviewed by reporters in March 2011, told the paper that she had to set aside $350 every month for her rental costs and some other portions of the cash for her school fees. Both her father and stepfather were unable to come to Singapore to take care of her as they themselves also had financial difficulties; the biological father Li had to take care of his then two-year-old son and did not earn much from his taxi driver job, while Chen, her stepfather, whom the girl got along well with, was also not earning much and need to take care of her younger stepsister. According to Grace, her birth father had been feeling guilty for not being able to take care of her, and voiced his regret to her whenever he drank, while her stepfather could not get over her mother's death. She said that she has tried to advise her stepfather to move on and look for another wife when she last visited him in China in June 2010. She expressed hope for her future and stated that she wanted to learn about design and obtain a diploma in a local polytechnic.

From an official website of a local church in Singapore, it was revealed that Grace had graduated with a diploma from Nanyang Polytechnic and turned to Christianity for solace over the death of her mother, which allowed her to move on with her life after the traumatic incidents at Yishun.

== In the media ==
In 2015, the case was re-enacted in Crimewatch, airing as the fourth episode of the show's 2015 season. The episode was available on meWATCH and also on the official YouTube channel of the Singapore Police Force. Subsequently, meWATCH's creator and operator Mediacorp (Singapore's national television broadcasting corporation) uploaded the Crimewatch episode of the Yishun murders on its official YouTube channel on 18 May 2021 with English subtitles, making it available for more viewers since the date.

A local author named Yeo Suan Futt wrote a book titled Murder Most Foul: Strangled, Poisoned and Dismembered in Singapore. The Yishun murders case was included as the first chapter of the book, which also wrote about 11 other cases from Singapore. The book was first published by Marshall Cavendish International Asia on 10 April 2013, four months after Wang Zhijian was sentenced to death for the murder of Yang Jie by the High Court.

In July 2015, Singapore's national daily newspaper The Straits Times published an e-book titled Guilty As Charged: 25 Crimes That Have Shaken Singapore Since 1965, which included the Yishun triple murder case as one of the top 25 crimes that shocked the nation since its independence in 1965. The book was borne out of collaboration between the newspaper and the Singapore Police Force.

== See also ==
- Capital punishment in Singapore
- List of major crimes in Singapore
