= Murder of Goh Beng Choo =

1980 unsolved murder of a girl in Singapore

Goh Beng Choo
- Born: Goh Beng Choo c. 1972; Singapore
- Died: 19 November 1980 (aged 8); Bukit Batok, Singapore
- Cause of death: Murdered
- Known for: Murder victim

On 19 November 1980, the body of 8-year-old Goh Beng Choo (Chinese: 吴明珠; pinyin: Wú Míngzhū) was found behind a Taoist temple in Bukit Batok, Singapore.

== Background ==
Goh Beng Choo's family lived in the now-demolished village of Jalan Petua in present-day Bukit Batok. Beng Choo, a Primary Two student of Jurong Primary School, performed well at school and achieved eighth position in her class that year.

== Murder ==
On the evening of 19 November 1980, the Goh family was celebrating Beng Choo's academic achievements when Beng Choo walked out of the house. Goh's then-ten-year-old brother Goh Leng Hai last saw her on the road in front of their house as he went to buy noodles for his family. She was missing for a few hours before her body was found behind a Taoist temple in the village, about 120 metres from her home, a structure that was rarely used, mostly for celebratory events.

Goh had scratch marks on her face, neck and arms and her blouse was slightly torn. The cause of death was a ruptured liver, resulting from blows to the abdomen. Dr Ong Beng Hock, a pathologist, found bruises all over her face, body and limbs. Goh was also sexually assaulted prior to her death.

It was revealed that shortly before her death, Goh had refused an unknown man's invitation to go fishing at a nearby pond.

Despite extensive inquiries by the police's Criminal Investigation Department, the police were unable to come up with any leads in the case. In 1982, Goh's family offered a $10,000 reward for information about the case.

== Aftermath ==
Sometime after the incident, the village of Jalan Petua was demolished and rebuilt into a Housing and Development Board estate. The Goh family's old house is at the present-day Bukit Batok Central Road, near West Mall.

In 2021, Goh's brother Goh Leng Hai reached out to Crime Library Singapore, a volunteer group dedicated to solving cold crimes and missing persons cases. Crime Library Singapore put up a post on Facebook appealing for information about the case. Several people, including several of the Goh family's old neighbours in Jalan Petua and a police officer who attended the scene of the crime on the day Goh was murdered, replied to the Facebook post.

In June 2021, Goh's family met with police investigators at the Police Cantonment Complex. The police assured Goh's family that they would continue their work on the case.

In January 2022, Goh's brother and elderly parents again made a public appeal for information to help solve the case. It was mentioned that Goh's parents, who were now in their 80s, still felt very sad, especially on the Qingming Festival and on the anniversary of her death. Goh's father also keeps only one photo in his wallet; a photo of Goh.

In November 2023, the Chinese-language crime show Inside Crime Scene covered the murder of Goh Beng Choo in the first episode of the show's second season. The case of Huang Na, another eight-year-old girl who was similarly sexually assaulted and murdered in 2004, was also covered in the same episode.

== See also ==
- List of major crimes in Singapore
- List of unsolved murders (1980–1999)
- Murder of Huang Na
- Death of Lim Shiow Rong
