= Cheuk Mei Mei =

Hong Kong drug mule executed in Singapore in 1994

- 卓美薇
- Cheuk after her arrest in 1989
- Born: 1 January 1965; Hong Kong
- Died: 5 March 1994 (aged 29); Changi Prison, Singapore
- Citizenship: British Dependent Territories citizen
- Occupation: Sales clerk
- Status: Executed
- Conviction: Drug trafficking
- Penalty: Death

Chinese name
- Chinese: 卓美薇
- Hanyu Pinyin: Zhuó Měiwēi
- Jyutping: coek^{3} mei^{5} mei^{4}

Cheuk Mei Mei (Chinese: 卓美薇; Jyutping: coek^{3} mei^{5} mei^{4}; 1 January 1965 – 5 March 1994) was a 29-year-old female Hong Kong resident who was executed in Singapore for drug trafficking. Cheuk was the first foreign woman convicted of a drug offence in Singapore to be executed.

After purportedly being forced to work as a courier for a drug trafficking organization, Cheuk was arrested while in possession of over 2 kilograms of high-quality heroin during a stopover in Singapore's Changi Airport.

Despite vehemently protesting her innocence and stating that she was tricked into smuggling narcotics, Cheuk was found guilty at trial and condemned to death, with the Singaporean authorities being ultimately undeterred by pleas for clemency.

== Biography ==
Born in British Hong Kong in 1965, Cheuk Mei Mei was living in the Ho Man Tin Estate and working as a sales clerk at the time of her arrest.

== Arrest at Changi Airport ==
On 28 February 1989, Cheuk and her Hong Konger accomplice Tse Po Chung (謝保忠) from the Wah Fu Estate flew into Changi Airport, Singapore, from Phuket, arriving at 2:25 pm, and were awaiting on a connecting flight to Amsterdam via Kuwait due to depart at 9:55 pm that evening. Plainclothes customs officers on routine surveillance had observed them acting suspiciously in the transit lounge. Their behaviour caught the attention of three different officers, who watched them for more than one hour before approaching them at about 4 pm.

Cheuk and Tse both wore baggy denim jeans and appeared to be very nervous when questioned. The couple claimed they did not know one other, despite being seen talking to each other several times. When searched, 24 individual plastic bags full of a whitish powder were discovered strapped to the thighs and lower legs of both of them. After removing and weighing the plastic bags, Tse was found to be carrying 2.178 kilograms and Cheuk was carrying 2.190 kilograms. Using a Narcoban drug test kit, the customs officials determined the powder was heroin.

Central Narcotics Bureau officer Teo Chin Seng thereafter took over the investigation, and at 2:30 am the following morning he interrogated Cheuk and Tse regarding the narcotics they were caught with. Tse gave a brief statement claiming he had agreed to take "something" from Phuket to Amsterdam to repay a debt to moneylenders but he did not know he was carrying heroin, where as Cheuk also claimed to have agreed to undertake a trip to Thailand to help her boyfriend repay a debt and she also did not know the bags strapped to her legs contained heroin.

On 2 March 1989, Cheuk and Tse were formally charged with importing heroin, worth an estimated $6 million, into Singapore and then remanded in custody to face trial.

== Trial ==
On 6 January 1992, Deputy Public Prosecutor Jennifer Marie informed the court how customs officers on routine surveillance had spotted Cheuk and Tse disembarking from a Thai Airways flight and pulled them in for questioning. They subsequently found heroin strapped to their thighs and lower legs, as well as in their shoes. Cheuk had 2.18 kg of heroin and Tse had 2.19 kg of heroin in their possession respectively. The Prosecution claimed that when Tse was questioned by officers shortly after his arrest about the substance strapped to his body, he replied it was "pak fun", which the literal translation from Cantonese is "white powder" but in Hong Kong is the slang term for heroin, whereas Cheuk replied that she did not know what was in the plastic bags.

On 7 January 1992, Cheuk testified in her defence that she thought she was smuggling gold jewellery into Singapore from Bangkok. She claimed a man who she was having an affair with named Fei Chai persuaded her to come with him to Bangkok, however he was then unable to travel. He pleaded with her to still go ahead, as his life would be in danger if the jewellery was not moved to Singapore. She met Tse, whom she knew casually, at Kai Tak airport in Hong Kong, where they both flew out to Thailand together. They met 3 other men in Bangkok, who subsequently tied packages to her legs just before they boarded a flight to Singapore. Cheuk claimed she did not ask what they contained, as she was in a bad mood at the time. Tse remained silent when called to give his defence, though his lawyer Freddy Neo testified that Tse had previously declared in a written statement after his arrest that he had agreed to take "something" to Holland for a moneylender he owed HK$30,000 to.

On 13 January 1992, defence lawyers asserted that Cheuk and Tse did not know they were carrying drugs, hence they were not guilty of importation. Lawyer Freddy Neo also asserted that the act of importation was compete only once goods crossed the official customs barrier, therefore the pair could not have 'imported' the drugs as they both remained in the transit lounge. He further submitted that the act of importing must have the intention of delivering it to someone in Singapore.

Deputy Public Prosecutor Jennifer Marie replied that recent court cases, such as the trial of Lau Chi Sing, had determined that 'import' meant bringing something into the country, whatever the purpose may be and regardless of whether Singapore was the ultimate destination or not, and regardless of whether it was delivered to anyone or not. She further argued that both accused must have known they were carrying drugs, as the heroin was wrapped in clear plastic cellophane bags and their contents could clearly be seen. They would also have had ample opportunity to examine the contents in the time it took to strap the packages to their legs.

== Verdict ==
On 14 January 1992, Cheuk and Tse were both found guilty as charged and condemned to death for importing 3.8 kilograms of pure heroin into Singapore, contrary to Section 7 of the Misuse of Drugs Act. Trial judges Justice S. Rajendran and Justice M.P.H. Rubin commented they did not accept their defence that they did not know they were carrying drugs, stating that Tse exercising his right to silence instead of rebutting the prosecution's allegations against him gave rise to an adverse inference that he knew he was carrying illegal drugs. Likewise, Tse not rebutting the claim he said "pak fun" when asked what was strapped to his body after his arrest left the court with no option but to accept it into evidence. Although Cheuk was deemed to be tentative while giving her evidence, the judges did not believe she was so unintelligent to not realize she was carrying drugs, noting that it would be impossible to mistake the white powdery substance being secured to her legs for gold jewellery. The court also asserted that when narcotics are brought anywhere into the geographical limits of Singapore, an offence of importing is committed under the provisions of the Misuse of Drugs Act.

== Appeal ==
On 23 February 1993, the Court of Appeal dismissed their appeal and upheld their sentences. Rejecting their defence that they did not in fact import any drugs, as they were in transit and did not pass the official customs barrier, Justice Chao Hick Tin commented that Changi Airport transit lounge could theoretically be used as a centre for international drug trafficking if the word 'import' was used in the restricted sense contended by Cheuk and Tse. Conceding that 'import' could have a different technical meaning under different Acts (for example the Customs Act), Justice Chao Hick Tin asserted that there was no such ambiguity in the Misuse of Drugs Act, and import was defined therein as bringing any proscribed item into the territory of Singapore by land, sea or air.

Cheuk had also separately challenged her conviction on the basis that she should not have had a joint trial with Tse as they were not charged with the same offence. Cheuk's lawyers argued that the joint trial prejudiced her own defense by having the trial judge's negative impression of Tse adversely affecting her own case, coupled with Tse remaining silent resulting in her being unable to compel him to give evidence which could support her own testimony. However, the court ruled that both offences had been jointly committed in the same transaction with a common purpose, therefore a joint trial was legally appropriate. In addition, the court dismissed accusations of prejudice by highlighting how Cheuk's defence was disregarded due to it being unbelievable and that any unfavourable view of Tse's case would ultimately be irrelevant to this fact. Likewise, since Tse had remained silent during the trial the court did not know what evidence he had, therefore there was no way of knowing what effect such evidence would have had on the outcome of the case against Cheuk and it could not be argued that his refusal to testify had impaired her rights.

== Execution ==
Cheuk Mei Mei and Tse Po Chung were both hanged at Changi Prison on the morning of 5 March 1994.

Cheuk Mei Mei was the first female foreigner to be executed for a drug offence in Singapore. Before that, the first Singaporean woman to be executed for drug trafficking was Low Hong Eng, a seamstress and mother of four who was hanged on 9 October 1981 for smuggling 459.3 g of diamorphine.

== See also ==
- Capital punishment for drug trafficking
- Capital punishment in Singapore
