= Hougang double murders =

1993 murder of a married couple in Singapore

- Luke Yip Khuan, one of the two victims killed
- Date: 26 February 1993
- Location: Hougang, Singapore
- Outcome: Jamaludin charged with murder in 1993; Jamaludin found guilty of two counts of murder and sentenced to death in 1994; Jamaludin executed by hanging at Changi Prison in 1995
- Deaths: Lau Gek Leng (53); Luke Yip Khuan (55)
- Injuries: None
- Convicted: Jamaludin Ibrahim (38)
- Verdict: Guilty
- Convictions: Murder (2 counts)
- Sentence: Death penalty

On 26 February 1993, inside their matrimonial flat at Hougang, Singapore, a married couple were discovered dead by both their son and youngest daughter. The victims of the killings were 53-year-old Lau Gek Leng (Chinese: 刘玉龙; Pe̍h-ōe-jī: Lâu Ge̍k-lêng; pinyin: Líu Yùlóng) and 55-year-old Luke Yip Khuan (Chinese: 陆月晴; pinyin: Lù Yuèqíng). It was determined that the killings were committed in the course of a robbery, because the Lau family's television set and VCR were missing from the flat. On the same day, a neighbour of the couple, 38-year-old Jamaludin Ibrahim, was arrested as a suspect due to a spanner belonging to him was found at the crime scene and one of Jamaludin's six daughters having witnessed him stealing the said missing items from the murdered couple's flat.

Jamaludin, who was charged with murder, claimed that he was not fully conscious of his actions due to effects of drugs, but Jamaludin was deemed to be fully aware of the magnitude of his actions after a psychiatric examination from the prosecution's expert. Hence, on 21 November 1994, Jamaludin was sentenced to death by the High Court for the two murders. Jamaludin was put to death by hanging on 28 July 1995 after spending more than eight months on death row.

== Murders and arrest ==
Lau Gek Leng, one of the two victims killed.

On 26 February 1993, a 20-year-old female student from Ngee Ann Polytechnic had just finished attending class and arrived back home at her Hougang flat. However, she repeatedly knocked on the door and her parents, who were last seen at home, did not respond to the knocks. Therefore, the girl contacted her 27-year-old brother, who worked as a merchandise buyer, to come back. Upon opening the door, both the Lau siblings made the gruesome discovery of their parents, both aged in their fifties, dead inside the flat. The male victim was said to have multiple knife wounds on his head and was mutilated, while the female victim was stabbed on the neck and sustained head injuries as well.

The police were contacted and they arrived to conduct investigations. The male victim was 53-year-old Lau Gek Leng, while the female was Lau's 55-year-old wife Luke Yip Khuan, who both lived together in the flat with their son and two daughters. According to neighbours and the couple's three children, Lau suffered from a traffic accident, which caused him to unable to move his legs and therefore, he was unemployed and stayed at home. Luke, on the other hand, was a hairdresser who provided her hairdressing services in the flat. The couple were described as nice people. The police later recovered a bloodstained chopper and spanner, and they deduced the motive was robbery, since a television set and VCR belonging to the family were missing.

On that same day, the police swiftly arrested a suspect. The suspect was 38-year-old repairman Jamaludin Ibrahim, and he was charged with two counts of murder the next day on 27 February 1993. It was also reported that Jamaludin was a neighbour of the Laus, and shared a good relationship with the family.

On 2 March 1993, the couple's funerals were conducted and they were cremated. The couple's three bereaved children were also planning to move out of their Hougang flat to a new place, due to them not wanting to be reminded of their parents' deaths at their family flat.

== Trial of Jamaludin ==
=== Prosecution's case ===
Jamaludin bin Ibrahim
- Jamaludin Ibrahim, the Hougang double killer
- Born: c. 1955; Singapore
- Died: 28 July 1995 (aged 40); Changi Prison, Singapore
- Cause of death: Execution by hanging
- Status: Executed
- Conviction: Murder (2 counts)
- Penalty: Death (x2)

On 17 October 1994, the trial of Jamaludin Ibrahim began at the High Court, with Justice T S Sinnathuray hearing the case. Abdul Rahman Salleh and B J Lean were the defence lawyers who represented Jamaludin, while the prosecution was led by Wong Keen Oon.

Jamaludin's daughter Haslina, who was ten years old, came to court as a prosecution witness. She testified that on the day of the murder, she heard screams coming from the flat of Lau Gek Leng and Luke Yip Khuan. She also witnessed her father, whose clothing had bloodstains, carrying a television set and VCR out of the same flat, after she heard the screams. Similarly, Jamaludin's wife Saerah Mohammad Yusop, who heard from her daughter about what she witnessed, came to court as a witness, telling the court that she identified the spanner found at the crime scene as her husband's. She also noted that during the final few months before the killings, her husband incurred huge debts and could not pay the electricity and water bills, causing him to become bad tempered and he had to consume tranquilizers to keep calm. Jamaludin also allegedly told his wife that he felt that one of the victims Luke despised him. Subsequently, due to the case's public attention and harassment of Jamaludin's family by both reporters and members of the public, the prosecution applied to the court to impose a gag order, ordering the media to not publish the identities or other personal details of Jamaludin's family during the court proceedings of Jamaludin's case, and it was granted.

A doctor also came to testify that he prescribed tranquilizers, including valium, to Jamaludin over the past ten months leading up to the murders, due to Jamaludin suffering from insomnia or difficulty to fall asleep. He agreed that while the effects of these drugs may lead to short-term memory loss and addiction, he observed that Jamaludin was perfectly normal despite consuming the tranquilizers.

=== Defence's case ===
After the end of the prosecution's case, Jamaludin elected to take the stand to present his defence. His main defence was diminished responsibility.

Jamaludin testified that on that day itself, he went to the couple's flat to get a haircut, like he occasionally would whenever he need to cut his hair. He revealed that Luke asked him to help repair a leaking kitchen pipe, and thus he returned to his flat to retrieve an adjustable spanner. He said that after entering the flat, he had a sudden blackout and did not know what happened, but he remembered seeing illusions of being attacked by two or three people, and the next thing he saw was the two dead bodies of his neighbours Lau Gek Leng and Luke Yip Khuan. Jamaludin said that out of fright at the sight of the bodies, he stole the television set and VCR to tamper with the crime scene and make it look like a robbery. He claimed that he consumed an overdose of valium pills (some of which were supplied by his sister), which was why he suffered from hallucinations and did not know or recall exactly how he killed the couple. Jamaludin denied the prosecution's contention that he came to the flat under the pretense of getting a haircut with robbery in his mind. Jamaludin also denied that he intentionally used the spanner and a chopper to attack the couple by first assaulting Lau repeatedly with the spanner in the living room before closing in on Luke to rain multiple blows with the chopper and spanner to kill her off as well, and he also stated that he would not kill for money despite needing it.

In his testimony, Jamaludin further revealed that the reason why he consumed tranquilizers was due to the reason that he witnessed his sister's suicide. He added that in 1988, his sister, who was his most favourite out of his siblings, suffered from schizophrenia and fell to her death, and it greatly traumatized him. Furthermore, in 1989, by coincidence, Jamaludin was a witness of a murder case, because he witnessed one of his neighbours throwing two of her three children off the 11th storey of the same flat he resided in. Jamaludin added he tried to save the third child but the little girl fell to her death as well. These two above incidents caused Jamaludin to be traumatized to the extent that he turned to tranquilizers to help him get over the shock. In the aftermath of the 1989 incident, Jamaludin's neighbour Lim Lai Choo, who also jumped down but survived and became unable to walk, was charged with murder for killing her three children, and was in the end sentenced to nine years' imprisonment for manslaughter due to depression, but in 1995, the year when she was paroled and released after serving six years, Lim committed suicide.

Edward Odgen, an Australian psychiatrist, testified that Jamaludin was suffering from paradoxical rage induced by the Valium pills, and it caused him to inflict an extremely appalling, frenzied and brutal attack on the victims, and was therefore suffering from diminished responsibility. However, the prosecution's expert psychiatrist Chan Khim Yew, head of the prison medical unit, testified that Jamaludin was perfectly normal at the time he killed both Lau and Luke, and also determined that he did not have a personality disorder or mental disease, and had no history of psychiatric illnesses despite his late sister's schizophrenic condition.

== Verdict ==
On 21 November 1994, at the end of the Hougang double murder trial, the trial judge T S Sinnathuray delivered his judgement.

Justice Sinnathuray determined that Jamaludin was not suffering from an abnormality of the mind when he killed both Lau Gek Leng and Luke Yip Khuan. He accepted the prosecution's arguments that Jamaludin came to the flat with the intention to rob the couple out of desperation to discharge his debts, and killed them in turn to avoid leaving behind witnesses to his crime. Justice Sinnathuray therefore rejected Jamaludin's defence of diminished responsibility, and as a result, 39-year-old Jamaludin Ibrahim was found guilty of two charges of murder and sentenced to death. Jamaludin was reportedly calm when he heard the trial judge pronouncing the death penalty upon him. Haslina cried at the sight of her father being sentenced to death for the murders.

According to Haslina, she still loved her father despite what he had done. She said that after the murders, her mother, who worked as a chambermaid, had to take care of her and her five other sisters (aged between two and 15) alone. Jamaludin's family also had to move out of their three-room Hougang flat to live with the mother of Jamaludin's wife in Clementi. Haslina stated she felt uncomfortable about her classmates discussing her father's crime and hoped that she could move on in life and do her favourite activities like badminton and watching television.

== Execution ==
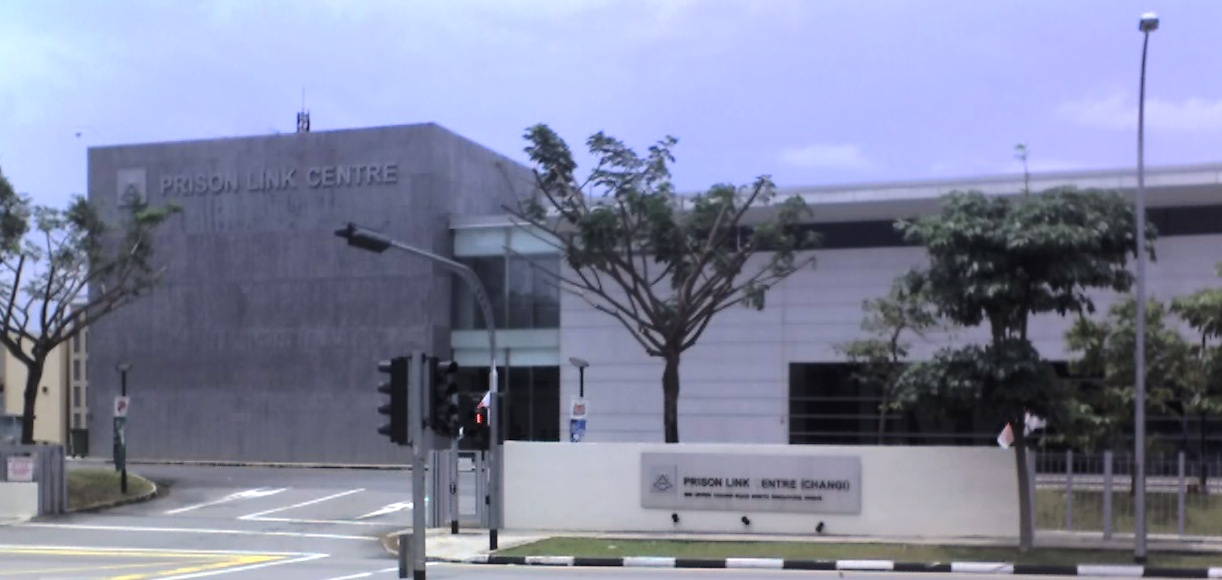
Changi Prison, where Jamaludin was hung in 1995 for the Hougang murders.

After he was sentenced to death, Jamaludin appealed against both his murder convictions and two death sentences, but the Court of Appeal rejected his appeal on 6 February 1995 and upheld his death sentences. As a final bid to escape the gallows, Jamaludin appealed to the President of Singapore for clemency, which would allow his sentence be commuted to life imprisonment if successful, but the petition was rejected on 1 June 1995. This led to Jamaludin's sentence being finalized and his death warrant was underway to schedule his execution.

Nearly two months after losing his final death row plea, 40-year-old Jamaludin Ibrahim was hanged at Changi Prison on 28 July 1995. Two Indian businessmen 34-year-old Govindarajulu Murali and 47-year-old Amrutham Chenchaiah, who were convicted of smuggling 325g of heroin, were also executed on the same day as Jamaludin. Like Jamaludin, both men had also exhausted their appeals after receiving the death penalty in November 1993.

== See also ==
- Capital punishment in Singapore
