= Tiong Bahru bus hijacking =

1979 Bus hijacking in Singapore

- Tiong Bahru (Singapore)
- Location: 1.285912°N 103.830078°E; Tiong Bahru, Singapore
- Date: November 29, 1979; 46 years ago 3:45 pm – 4:15 pm (UTC+08:00)
- Deaths: Yong Kwee Kong
- Victim: 3 hostages
- Perpetrators: Yong Kwee Kong; Lim Kok Yew
- Charges: Hostage Taking and Vehicle Hijacking
- Verdict: Guilty
- Convicted: Lim Kok Yew

The Tiong Bahru bus hijacking occurred on 29 November 1979 in Singapore. Two armed men, in an attempt to escape arrest for an earlier robbery, took hostages and then hijacked a bus, while exchanging gunfire with police. The incident ended when one of the men was wounded and then committed suicide, and the other surrendered to the authorities.

== Background ==
Yong Kwee Kong was a 27 year old Malaysian criminal from Bemban New Village in Malacca, who had previously been involved in almost 40 major crimes in both Singapore and Malaysia. Originally charged with burglary in 1974, Yong went on the run to the border area with Thailand, and returned in 1976 with arms and ammunition with the intent to commit more crimes. Malaysian authorities believed Yong worked as a hired killer and he was the chief suspect in two murders, one of which being the shooting of the wife of former Malacca magistrate Joseph Yap in Bukit Baru. In April 1979, the Royal Malaysia Police offered a $5,000 reward for information leading to his arrest, and posted reward posters on police notice boards throughout Peninsular Malaysia.

Yong and his 20 year old Malaysian accomplice Lim Kok Yew were wanted by Singapore Police Force in connection with an earlier August 1979 armed robbery of the Teo Cheng Teoh Construction Company at Magazine Road, where over $12,000 in cash (the worker's payroll) and the jewellery of several victim's was taken at gunpoint by three men who later escaped in the yellow Toyota Corolla company car.

== Yong Siak Street police raid ==
On the afternoon of 29 November 1979, acting on a tip off, over 70 men from the C.I.D., Police Tactical Team, and Singaporean Police surrounded an apartment at Block 78 of Yong Siak Street in Tiong Bahru. When C.I.D. Inspector Liau Tick Liong called on the occupants of the apartment to surrender via a loud hailer, inside the building Yong produced a pair of handcuffs and a revolver, then handcuffed tenants Grace Wah Ai Lian and Jennifer Chog Pak Moi to each other. Yong and Lim then pointed guns at the two women's heads, pushed them out the front door and used them as human shields while walking slowly down the street, heading north towards Kim Pong Road.

When they arrived at Block 29 at the junction of Lim Liak Street, Inspector Liau again ordered Yong and Lim to surrender, and Yong fired a shot towards the police. When Inspector Colin Choo warned them not to escape, Yong again fired a shot in the direction of the police.

== Bus hijack ==
1 hostage taking- Block 78, Yong Siak Street
2 exchange of gunfire - Block 29, Lim Liak Street
3 bus hijack - junction of Kim Pong Road & Tiong Bahru Road

At the traffic junction of Kim Pong Road and Tiong Bahru Road, approximately 500 meters away from the apartment in Block 78, Yong and Lim forced a bus stopped at traffic lights to open its doors and then boarded it with their two hostages. Yong and Lim ordered the bus driver to drive away, but he hesitated and was then shot in the left arm. On witnessing this, Inspector Steven Koh of the Police Tactical Team immediately opened fire on Yong with his Sterling submachine gun.

Yong was hit in the right upper chest and slumped to the floor of the bus. He shouted to Lim that he was going to kill himself, and then pointed his .22 caliber Astra revolver at his temple and pulled the trigger, ending his life. Lim then went to the rear of the bus and pointed his own gun at his head, but when he pulled the trigger it did not fire. He then threw the pistol out of the bus and walked out the back door of the vehicle to surrender to the police, who then arrested him.

On 30 November 1979, Lim was charged with the illegal possession of a .38 caliber Smith & Wesson revolver and 19 rounds of ammunition and was remanded in custody.

== Trial of Lim Kok Yew ==
On 23 February 1981, the High Court heard a summary of the hostage taking and subsequent hijacking of the bus by the two men. Lim claimed he wanted to surrender to the police at the Kim Pong Road apartment, but Yong had prevented him and then forced him into taking hostages under duress. Under cross examination by Deputy Public Prosecutor Fong Kwok Jen, he denied being wanted by the police at the time of the incident, but admitted he knew Yong was a wanted man due to him being armed.

== Verdict and sentencing ==
On 5 March 1981, Lim was found guilty as charged and sentenced to death for being an accomplice of a person who uses arms while committing a scheduled offence, contrary to Section 5 of the Arms Offences Act. The trial judges Justice A P Rajah and Justice F A Chua rejected Lim's testimony that he was forced by Yong into taking Grace Wah Ai Lian hostage under the threat of death, thus he could not avail of the exception in Section 94 of the Penal Code that provides defence for those forced to threaten injury to others.

Lim lost an appeal against his sentence on 13 September 1982, and was subsequently hanged in Changi Prison on the morning of 8 June 1984.

== See also ==
- Capital punishment in Singapore
