= Teo Cheng Leong =

Singaporean criminal (1933–1971)

- Police mugshot of Teo Cheng Leong, first taken in 1969
- Born: Teo Cheng Leong c. 1933; Singapore, Straits Settlements
- Died: c. May 1971 (aged 38); Changi Prison, Singapore
- Cause of death: Execution by hanging
- Occupation: Odd job worker
- Status: Executed
- Convictions: Armed robbery (1954); Burglary (1961); Failure to report to police (1963); Armed robbery (1965); Criminal breach of trust (1966); Failure to report to police (1966); Illegal discharge of a firearm with intent to cause harm (1970); Armed robbery (1970)
- Criminal charges: Armed robbery (1954); Burglary (1961); Failure to report to police (1963); Armed robbery (1965); Criminal breach of trust (1966); Failure to report to police (1966); Illegal discharge of a firearm with intent to cause harm (1969); Armed robbery (1969)
- Penalty: Seven years' imprisonment (1954); Three years' imprisonment (1961); One year of imprisonment (1963); Three years' imprisonment (1965); Ten months' imprisonment (1966; criminal breach of trust); 18 months' imprisonment (1966; failure to report to police); Death (1970)

Teo Cheng Leong (Chinese: 张清良; pinyin: Zhāng Qīngliáng) was a Singaporean gunman and armed robber. Teo was one of the four perpetrators of a firearm robbery at Geylang on 26 March 1969, in which he robbed a housewife of her valuables and S$1,000 in cash, and he later fired two rounds at a police inspector while being cornered by the police, who all arrested him at a hut he was hiding in. In Singapore's first capital trial without a jury, Teo was found guilty of discharging his firearm and sentenced to death in February 1970. Teo became the first person to be given the death penalty after the abolition of jury trials for capital crimes in Singapore. After losing his appeals against the conviction and sentence, Teo was hanged in May 1971.

== Early life and employment ==
Teo was born in Singapore in 1933. He neither married nor had children, and worked odd jobs to sustain himself.

== Criminal history ==
As an adult, Teo committed multiple major crimes, with his final one being a robbery leading to a gunfight in 1969. He had previously been found guilty in five cases.

On 27 September 1954, he was sentenced to jail for seven years on a charge of armed robbery. Later, on 7 January 1961, he was convicted again, of breaking and entering, and thus jailed for three years.

In a third case, Teo failed to report to the police while under supervision, and hence spent one year in prison after his conviction for the offence on 23 April 1963. Teo was convicted for the fourth time and, on 2 December 1965, sentenced to three years' imprisonment after he committed armed robbery with several other people.

In his fifth case, Teo was found guilty of criminal breach of trust; on 3 September 1966, he was sentenced to ten months' imprisonment. On the same day, he was sentenced to another 18 months' imprisonment after being charged in court for failing to report to the police while under supervision.

=== Sims Avenue robbery and gunfight (1969) ===
On 26 March 1969, a 36-year-old Teo teamed up with three other men to commit armed robbery along Sims Avenue.

On the afternoon of the same day, the four robbers broke into the shophouse of 39-year-old cobbler Chew Sin Kok. Teo and one of his accomplices each wielded a gun while the other two were armed with knives. The robbers held the existing occupants of the shophouse hostage, and robbed Chow Sow Lin, a housewife and mother of four, of her valuables and S$1,000 in cash, as well as two wrist watches, a camera and radio. Chew, who had been on a lunch break during the holdup, initially called the police after returning, but instead sought the help of nearby residents ten minutes later and alerted them about the holdup. The crowd he had gathered chased the robbers after finding them in the process of escaping from the shophouse.

While escaping along Geylang Road, Teo split up with his accomplices, who turned onto Lorong 40 Geylang; he carried his gun and some of the loot. While Teo was running to Lorong 39, several members of the crowd alerted a passing patrol car driven by Desmond D'Oliveiro, an inspector stationed at Joo Chiat Police Station. After chasing Teo with several men from the crowd, all of whom had been allowed into the car, D'Oliveiro reached an empty forest hut, where he and two more officers cornered Teo. A brief gunfight occurred, with Teo rushed out of the hut to fire two shots at D'Oliveiro, who evaded the bullets and was unharmed; the police returned fire twice at Teo, who returned to the hut similarly unharmed. A few minutes after police reinforcements arrived and tear gas was fired into the hut, Teo was forced to emerge and surrendered. He was therefore subdued by the police, and placed under arrest for both the robbery and his gunfight with the police. A stolen radio, a loaded revolver and a gold chain were recovered.

A day after the robbery, one of Teo's three accomplices, 28-year-old Khoo Meng Hwa, was arrested as the second suspect behind the case. Another accomplice, 33-year-old Ng Chwee Bock, surrendered himself to the police two days after Khoo was captured, becoming the third and last person to be apprehended for the robbery. The fourth man was never found.

Teo was charged with both armed robbery and illegal discharge of firearms, with the latter offence potentially carrying the death penalty under Singaporean law.

In June 1969, after a preliminary hearing, Teo's case was transferred to the High Court for a later trial hearing.

== Trial ==
=== Court hearing ===
On 17 February 1970, a 37-year-old Teo officially stood trial at the High Court for one count of firing two shots at D'Oliveiro under the 1955 Arms Offences Ordinance, as well as one count of armed robbery. On 5 January, a month before the beginning of Teo's trial, Singapore fully abolished the jury trial procedure for capital cases. Therefore, instead of a jury, he would be tried before two trial judges - A. V. Winslow and T. Kulasekaram - at the High Court. While pleading guilty to the armed robbery charge, Teo pleaded not guilty to the firearms charge, which carried either the death penalty or life imprisonment. Despite having pleaded guilty together with both arrested accomplices in the same court, he was to stand trial alone for attempting to shoot D'Oliveiro.

Before the trial was to begin, lawyer and opposition (Note: Singaporean politics has been dominated by the People's Action Party (PAP) since the 1959 general election, when Lee Kuan Yew became Singapore's first Prime Minister while Singapore was a self-governing state within the British Empire.) politician J. B. Jeyaretnam, who represented Teo, requested to the trial court that Teo be given a chance to undergo a jury trial, given that his crime took place in March 1969, about ten months before the complete abolition of capital jury trials on 5 January 1970, and that the case itself was a question of whether Teo's right to a jury trial was a substantive right or a procedural matter. In response, P. R. Isaac, the trial prosecutor, argued that the lack of a jury trial did not amount to a deprivation of Teo's substantive rights and that the request was invalid as the jury system had been abolished in Singapore. After a day of deliberation, the two judges agreed with the prosecution, stating that Teo had no right to a jury trial since the jury system under the old legislation had been abolished under the new legislation, which allowed two judges to preside death penalty trials, and this new procedure was to apply for all trials conducted after 5 January 1970, the official date of the jury system's abolition, irrespective to whether there were outstanding cases that happened before or after the abolition of jury trials.

D'Oliveiro appeared as a prosecution witness. In his testimony, while driving along Geylang Road that afternoon, he saw a large crowd which approached him, saying that a gang of four to five men armed with guns had fled to Lorong 40 after committing a robbery. He hence allowed four men to enter his car and proceeded to Lorong 39, where another crowd had gathered outside a small hut in the forest, where Teo had gone into hiding. By then, D'Oliveiro had been joined by three other policemen, one of whom called for reinforcements. Teo exited the hut and fired two shots at D'Oliveiro after the latter called for the former to exit. D'Oliveiro was taken by surprise but evaded the bullets unharmed; he did not fire back afterwards. Several other bystanders similarly testified that Teo had been aiming at D'Oliveiro.

Another witness was Police Constable (PC) Quek Chek Kwang (aka Quek Chek Kuan), one of the officers present at the scene. Quek testified that he saw D'Oliveiro calling the gunman out of the hut on threat of death, and that he later witnessed Teo exiting the hut to aim for D'Oliveiro, firing two shots.

Detective-Corporal Ng Poh Kiang, a third police officer at the scene, also testified in court that after Teo fired the two missed shots, he covered Inspector D'Oliveiro by firing back at the gunman twice, although the shots missed and Teo was left unharmed. After this brief gunfight, tear gas was fired into the hut, which forced Teo to emerge from the hut and surrendered. Senior Inspector H L Miranda, another policeman and witness, was also inquired about the recovery of the bullets, and he replied that except for one bullet belonging to Corporal Ng's gun, no other bullets, including those belonging to Teo's firearm, could be recovered from the hut. Both Justice Kulasekaram and Justice Winslow, together with the prosecution and defence counsel, headed to the crime scene during the course of Teo's trial to inspect the crime scene.

Teo was called to the stand to give his defence. Teo, who agreed to do so, denied under oath that he actually aimed the gun at Inspector D'Oliveiro and fired the two shots, and he instead testified that he fired in the air twice to warn the bystanders from getting near and he never had the intent to harm anyone throughout, and he also claimed that when he surrendered to the police, he already threw his gun away in the vegetation outside the hut, and i was not on his hand as what was recounted by all the witnesses earlier in court. Jeyaretnam also argued on Teo's behalf that the firearms charge was not proven beyond a reasonable doubt due to the lack of injury on Inspector D'Oliveiro and the failure to recover any bullets linking Teo to the crime, which would have helped reconstruct how Teo actually fired his gun, whether towards the policeman or in the air.

=== Verdict ===
On 24 February 1970, after a trial lasting four days, Justice Kulasekaram and Justice Winslow delivered their judgement. Justice Winslow, who pronounced the verdict in court, stated that both judges unanimously agreed that there was no doubt in their opinion that Teo had the intent to cause harm to Inspector D'Oliveiro when he discharged two rounds at the officer, and they agreed with the prosecution that despite the relatively close distance of 15 feet from where Teo fired the gun, Teo missed the shots twice and he was "inept" at wielding his gun with respect to the nature and condition of the gun. Justice Winslow also read that the police's failure to recover the spent ammunition from Teo's sidearm did not undermine the prosecution's case, and the absence of injuries on Inspector D'Oliveiro did not hold much weight against the prosecution's case either. They also accepted that Teo was still holding on to the gun at the time when the tear gas was fired and when he surrendered. On these grounds, Teo was found guilty of a single charge of firing two shots at Inspector D'Oliveiro with intent to injure him.

Aside from finding Teo guilty of the firearm charge, the two judges also weighed in on sentence, and in deciding between the sentence of either death by hanging or life in prison, the judges decided that no leniency was warranted in Teo's case in light of the aggravating circumstances and opted for the higher tier of sentence, and hence, 37-year-old Teo Cheng Leong was sentenced to death by hanging. On that same day, Teo was also sentenced to ten years' imprisonment for committing firearm robbery on the same date of the shooting.

== Appeal processes ==
In September 1970, Teo Cheng Leong, who was then incarcerated on death row at Changi Prison, engaged veteran lawyer and former opposition politician David Marshall to represent him in his appeal. Assisted by Jeyaretnam, Marshall argued before the Court of Appeal that Teo had a substantive accrued right to a jury trial, given that his crime was committed before the abolition of the jury trial, and having a trial without a jury in Teo's case was substantially a miscarriage of justice. Marshall, having described Teo as the first person sentenced to the gallows for a case where "no one was even hurt", stated that Teo never had the premeditation to cause injury to the police officer Desmond D'Oliveriro, and he only fired the shots out of desperation and anxiety to evade capture, and thus argued against Teo's conviction and death sentence. As for the prosecution, then Attorney-General Tan Boon Teik made a special appearance to assist the prosecutor S Rajendran, and Tan argued that the appeal should be dismissed as the jury system was completely abolished on 5 January 1970, which meant that Teo did not have a vested right to a jury trial and he could only be entitled to a trial by two judges at the High Court. Judgement was reserved after the prosecution completed their submissions.

On 21 October 1970, the Court of Appeal's three judges - Supreme Court judges Tan Ah Tah and Frederick Arthur Chua (F A Chua), and Chief Justice Wee Chong Jin - opted to reject Teo's appeal. They ruled that with regards to Marshall's arguments for a jury trial, they agreed with the prosecution that Teo's trial procedure issue was a procedural matter and a non-jury trial was not a miscarriage of justice in his case, since it was made clear that the jury trial system was fully abolished on 5 January 1970 and they cannot be revived under any circumstances. The appellate judges also found that Teo was indeed guilty of the charge and his death sentence was also upheld, after the appellate court agreed with the trial court's findings.

After losing his appeal against the sentence, Teo later petitioned for special leave to appeal to the Privy Council in London to review his case. On 8 February 1971, Teo's plea was denied by the Privy Council. After losing his Privy Council appeal, Teo had a final recourse to appeal to then President of Singapore Benjamin Sheares for clemency. However, it was rejected.

== Execution ==
After losing his final death row plea, a 38-year-old Teo was hanged at Changi Prison on an undated Friday morning in May 1971. At the time of his sentencing, Teo was the first person to be sentenced to death by two judges in the High Court after the abolition of jury trials in Singapore.

In November 1973, two years after Teo's execution, the Arms Offences Act was passed to make the death penalty mandatory for unlawful use of firearms (including the offence Teo was convicted for), replacing the previous firearm law which permitted life imprisonment.

36 years after Teo was executed, Singaporean crime show True Files re-enacted the Sims Avenue shooting case and the trial of Teo in 1970. The re-enactment first aired on 21 January 2007 as the third episode of the show's fifth and final season.

== See also ==
- Capital punishment in Singapore
