= Murder of Hor Koon Seng =

1974 fatal shooting of a soldier in Singapore

- Date: 2 April 1974
- Location: Portsdown Road, Singapore
- Motive: Resentment and anger over alleged unfair treatment in the army
- Deaths: Hor Koon Seng, 21
- Convicted: Liew Ah Chiew, 19
- Sentence: Death penalty

Hor Koon Seng, the 21-year-old army lieutenant who was shot and killed

On 2 April 1974, inside an army camp at Singapore's Portsdown Road, 19-year-old National Serviceman Liew Ah Chiew (刘亚超 Líu Yàchāo; also spelt Liew Ah Chew or Liew Ah Choy) used a rifle to shoot his platoon commander, 21-year-old 2nd Lieutenant Hor Koon Seng (何君成 Hé Jūnchēng) of the Singapore Armed Forces (SAF), resulting in Hor dying from a gunshot wound to his chest. Liew was arrested on the same day and was charged with murdering Lieutenant Hor, whom he killed due to his dissatisfaction and anger against Lieutenant Hor for wanting to bring forward disciplinary charges against him. Despite putting up a defence of diminished responsibility, Liew was found guilty of murder and sentenced to death on 25 October 1974. Liew's death sentence was upheld and finalized despite his appeals, and he was hanged on 28 November 1975.

== Shooting ==
=== Death of Hor Koon Seng ===
On the afternoon of 2 April 1974, the police responded to a report that an army platoon commander was shot dead at Portsdown Army Camp at Portsdown Road. When they arrived at the scene of crime inside the victim's office, the police discovered the body of a soldier, who had one gunshot wound on his right arm and another on his chest, which was the injury that resulted in the death of the victim. Two empty cartridges were also found nearby the scene. The victim was identified as 2nd Lieutenant Hor Koon Seng, who was 21 years old at the time of the shooting. He was known to be well-mannered and well-liked by his platoon.

=== Arrest and charges ===
Later, the police received information that the suspected shooter had escaped to a textile factory in Boon Keng after holding two soldiers hostage and forcing them to drive to the factory, where the suspect's girlfriend was working at. The police arrived at the factory and cordoned off the area for some time before the suspect finally surrendered at the persuasion of his girlfriend.

On 3 April 1974, the 19-year-old suspect, whose identity was Liew Ah Chiew, a National Serviceman and army private, was officially charged with the murder of Lieutenant Hor Koon Seng, and he was remanded for investigations and psychiatric assessments. Liew faced the death penalty if found guilty of murder. Liew was remanded at Queenstown Remand Prison pending trial for murder.

On 22 May 1974, Liew's charge of murder was substituted with a fresh charge of discharging a firearm with intent to cause injury under the Arms Offences Act. Under the Act, which was newly enacted the year before in 1973, the offence of firing a gun to cause hurt would also warrant the death penalty.

On 19 June 1974, after a preliminary hearing for the amended arms charge, Liew was ordered to stand trial for murder, after the original charge was restored in Liew's case.

== Murder trial ==
=== Background of Liew ===
Liew Ah Chiew, pictured in 1974

Born in mid-October 1954, Liew Ah Chiew was given away for adoption at birth, and grew up with his adoptive family. However, Liew did not share a good relationship with his adoptive parents and siblings. Liew went to Outram English School to complete his primary school education before he enrolled into St. Joseph's Secondary School to pursue his secondary school education. However, he had disciplinary issues during his time in secondary school, often committing theft and having fights with other students, and at one point, Liew was given two strokes of the cane by the principal for insulting a student's younger sister and called her a prostitute. Subsequently, after graduating from secondary school, Liew enlisted in the army to serve his two-year mandatory National Service in April 1973. He excelled in his marksmanship, but often got into disciplinary trouble during his time in the army.

=== Court proceedings ===
The murder trial of 19-year-old Liew Ah Chiew began on 7 October 1974 at the High Court. He was represented by criminal lawyer Richard Laycock, the son of British lawyer and former politician John Laycock. Solicitor-General Abdul Wahab Ghows was appointed as the trial prosecutor, and the trial was presided by two judges Choor Singh and D C D'Cotta.

==== Prosecution ====
One of the prosecution's witnesses was K. Ramanathan, a private who was a friend of Liew in the army camp. He testified that the bullets loaded into Liew's rifle were twelve of the fourteen bullets he stole from the armoury, and these were for the sake of replacing any lost bullets while on duty. Ramanathan, whose case for the theft of ammunition was pending at that time, testified that he kept two while giving the remaining twelve live rounds to Liew, who wanted to bring the bullets home. The day he gave Liew the bullets was the day before Lieutenant Hor was killed.

Another witness was Russell Oliveiro, an army lieutenant. Oliverio testified that he saw Liew confronting Lieutenant Hor at gunpoint, talking to him aggressively about an incident where a platoon mate was not charged for trying to stab Liew. While Lieutenant Hor was trying to calm Liew down, Liew noticed Oliveiro peeking from outside through the window, and Oliveiro was driven away by Liew with the warning that he would be shot at. Oliveiro said that after moving away, he witnessed and heard Lieutenant Hor telling Liew to calm down before he was shot and killed. Other witnesses, mostly the soldiers of the army camp, also testified about Liew's confrontation towards Lieutenant Hor before he discharged the rifle at the 21-year-old army officer, killing him instantly. According to army lieutenant Lim Hung Soon and Captain Sim Jhon, Liew threatened them at gunpoint to call for a vehicle, and threatened them to help him escape to his girlfriend's workplace in Boon Keng. Sim, then a lieutenant, was held hostage together with the driver during the journey to Boon Keng, and Liew had mentioned at one point he wanted to kill a Tan Yew Teck, another lieutenant, after Lieutenant Hor.

Liew Ah Chiew's girlfriend Tan Yoke Lian, a textile factory employee and Malaysian born in Pontian, Johor, testified that she knew Liew since their school days three years before, and described him as a soft-spoken person who treated her well, although he had a bad temper and could become violent when angry, and had slapped her on several occasions when he was in a fit of anger, and later apologised once he calmed down. Tan said that on the day of the incident, she saw two soldiers frantically running into the factory and saw that Liew was holding four to five factory workers at gunpoint, and asked them to let him see her. After meeting her boyfriend, Tan heard from Liew that he shot an army officer and he escaped to her workplace due to fear and confusion. Tan told the court that after hearing his explanation, she persuaded Liew to surrender and to not continue making matters worse, and he listened to her.

==== Defence ====
Liew, who turned 20 during the course of his trial, elected to give his defence on 16 October 1974. Liew testified that he never meant to kill Lieutenant Hor. He stated that since his enlistment in April 1973, he had been unhappy during his time in the army, as he could not get along with his platoon mates, was often punished for misconduct including an instance where he doctored his dental appointment card, resulting in him undergoing detention at the army barracks and loss of right to his privileges, and he perceived there was biased treatment against him compared to the others. Liew stated that on the day of the shooting, he got into a conflict with a platoon mate and broke the man's cup, and this led to Lieutenant Hor Koon Seng, his platoon commander, to warn Liew that there would be disciplinary charges against him. Liew, who was aggrieved at the fact that he would be disciplined for a less serious matter when another platoon mate was never punished for the more serious case of attempting to stab Liew, retaliated by refusing to obey orders to fall in for gardening, which earned Liew more reprimand from Lieutenant Hor.

Liew recounted that later, he went into Lieutenant Hor's office to meet up with his superior, bringing the rifle along with him, which he loaded with twelve stolen bullets he received from a platoon mate. Liew recounted that he felt insulted at Lieutenant Hor not taking him seriously and that led to him firing a single shot at the door to show that his rifle was loaded. As Liew got into a confrontation with Lieutenant Hor over not punishing the conscript who attempted to stab Liew, Liew noticed someone outside the office and got into a stage of panic and confusion. During which, the gun went off and Lieutenant Hor was shot in the chest. Liew stated he was shocked by the gunshot and claimed he never intend to kill Lieutenant Hor. After which, Liew held two soldiers hostage and asked them to drive him to his girlfriend's workplace, where he wanted to kill himself and his girlfriend before she persuaded him to surrender to the police.

Liew also put up a defence of diminished responsibility. Defence psychiatrist Tsoi Wing Foo testified that Liew suffered from a personality disorder, which was a result of his family background, his perceived lack of love and parental negligence, and demonstrated through his frequent bouts of emotional instability and moral issues. Dr Tsoi stated that the disorder itself was sufficient to impair Liew's mental faculties at the time of the shooting. However, the prosecution rebutted that Liew had intentionally committed the murder and was never in a state of panic or confusion when killing Lieutenant Hor in cold blood, and the psychiatric report should never be relied on, on the basis that the prosecution's psychiatric expert found no abnormal mental condition or inability to self-control on Liew's part, as corroborated by witness accounts of Liew's behaviour on the day of the murder.

=== Verdict ===
On 25 October 1974, after a trial lasting twelve days, the two trial judges - Justice Choor Singh and Justice D C D'Cotta - delivered their verdict.

In the judgement, Justice Singh, who pronounced the verdict, stated that at the close of the prosecution's submissions, both he and Justice D' Cotta found that there was sufficient evidence to prove that Liew had deliberately discharged the army rifle with intention to cause the death of Lieutenant Hor. He stated that the defence of diminished responsibility should not be used as a shield for murderers who killed in a fit of temper, and they were not satisfied that there was a substantial impairment of Liew's mental responsibility when he killed Lieutenant Hor, and instead, the killing was done out of the defendant's premeditation, cunningness, defiance and anger, and he was still in full control of his faculties at the time of the murder. Therefore, the judges rejected Liew's claims of accidental shooting and diminished responsibility.

Hence, 20-year-old Liew Ah Chiew was found guilty of murder, and sentenced to death. Reportedly, Liew's girlfriend Tan Yoke Lian was so devastated at the verdict that she fainted and had to be carried out of the courtroom by relatives. Liew's grandmother, who was also present in court to hear the verdict, became hysterical upon hearing that her grandson was given the death penalty for Lieutenant Hor's murder. Both women were seen crying outside the Supreme Court building, surrounded by relatives and friends who tried to console them.

== Appeal process ==
On 17 March 1975, Liew Ah Chiew filed an appeal to the Court of Appeal, and Richard Laycock, who remained as Liew's lawyer, argued that the trial judges erred in finding that Liew intentionally fired the rifle to kill Lieutenant Hor Koon Seng, stating that Liew had panicked at the time the second shot was discharged, and asked that the judges considered it be an unintended killing and reduce Liew's conviction. However, the three judges - Chief Justice Wee Chong Jin, and Supreme Court judges F A Chua and A V Winslow - found that the trial judges had correctly found Liew guilty of murder on the basis that the shooting was perpetuated with Liew's intention to cause Hor's death. Liew's appeal was therefore dismissed.

On 7 October 1975, Liew's application for special leave to appeal to the Privy Council in London had been rejected. In a final bid to escape the gallows, Liew submitted a petition for presidential clemency, which would allow his sentence be commuted to life imprisonment if successful. Similarly, Liew's lawyer Richard Laycock, as well as both Liew's grandmother and girlfriend, also drafted two more clemency pleas and submitted them with hopes to help Liew escape the gallows. However, on 22 November 1975, then President of Singapore Benjamin Sheares decided to, on the advice of the Cabinet, turn down the petitions, and therefore, Liew's death sentence was finalized and he was due to hang within a short time for the murder of Hor Koon Seng.

== Execution ==
On 28 November 1975, a week after his death row plea for clemency failed, 21-year-old Liew Ah Chiew was hanged at dawn in Changi Prison.

== See also ==
- Capital punishment in Singapore
