= 1995 Rowell Road shooting =

1995 non-fatal shooting of a moneylender in Singapore

- Date: 22 January 1995
- Time: Around 1am
- Location: Jalan Besar, Singapore
- Outcome: Tay found guilty of illegal discharge of firearms; Tay sentenced to death in February 2001; Tay hanged at Changi Prison on 26 October 2001
- Deaths: None
- Injuries: Lee Yang Ping (20)
- Convicted: Tay Chin Wah (68)
- Verdict: Guilty
- Convictions: Unlawful discharge of firearms under the Arms Offences Act
- Sentence: Death

On 22 January 1995, 63-year-old taxi driver Tay Chin Wah (郑清华 Zhèng Qīnghuá) fired a revolver in Singapore's Rowell Road at two men, Lee Yang Ping (李罗杰 Lǐ Luójié) and Soh Keng Ho (苏庆和 Sū Qìnghé), who both confronted Tay's girlfriend over a debt she owed to Lee, who was a moneylender. Tay was said to have committed the shooting out of anger over his girlfriend's predicament, and the shooting left Lee injured, but he survived with timely medical intervention. Tay was arrested in Malaysia and brought back for trial five years later, and in February 2001, he was sentenced to death under the Arms Offences Act on charges of illegally discharging his firearm with intent to cause harm. Tay's appeal was dismissed, and he was hanged on 26 October 2001.

== Shooting incident ==
On the early morning of 22 January 1995, a shooting incident occurred at the void deck of a HDB block in Rowell Road, Jalan Besar, where four shots were discharged. The shooting left one man injured and another man escaping unscathed.

According to the witnesses of the shooting, it was alleged that there was a confrontation between a couple and a moneylender, although the court documents verified that it was a confrontation between the couple and two men (one of them was the moneylender's companion). Both sides were said to be arguing over a debt of S$1,000 which the female member of the couple owed to the 20-year-old moneylender, Lee Yang Ping. The dispute grew heated, and it led to the female debtor's boyfriend, who tried to stand up for his girlfriend, to whip out a .38 Smith & Wesson revolver and fired a total of four shots at Lee and his 40-year-old companion Goh Keng Ho, who both fled after seeing the man discharging his revolver at them. One of the bullets struck the mobile phone of Lee, while another hit Lee directly on the buttocks. The rest of the bullets missed the two men, and Soh was not harmed during the shooting. Right after the shooting, the gunman and his girlfriend were reportedly witnessed leaving in a taxi and fleeing the scene.

After he was shot, Lee continued to run to a nearby coffee shop, and managed to catch a taxi to Tan Tock Seng Hospital. On the way to the hospital, Lee tried and successfully extracted the bullet by himself inside the taxi, reportedly copying the same way of how a fictional movie character and hero named Rambo treated his gunshot injuries. In response to Lee's actions, the doctor told the press that it was too risky for a gunshot victim to extract the bullet by oneself, as it might worsen the injury and caused a greater loss of blood, which may potentially lead to death.

Regardless, Lee was able to reach the hospital, underwent treatment, and eventually recovered from his gunshot wound. He was subsequently discharged from hospital a few days later and rejoined his family to celebrate Chinese New Year.

== Investigations ==
Meanwhile, the police conducted their investigations in the case, and classified the shooting case as one of unlawful discharge of firearms under the Arms Offences Act, which prescribes the death penalty for use of firearms in Singapore. After conducting a search around the area, the police were able to recover the three spent cartridges at the void deck, and aside from this, they sought to identify the suspected gunman, who was described to be an elderly man aged in his 60s. Although the police managed to identify the possible gunman and conducted a nationwide manhunt for the perpetrator, the suspect had already left Singapore. In fact, the police uncovered a shocking fact about the suspect, who was actually one of the fugitives on Singapore's wanted list for an unknown offence, and he had quietly changed his name and led a low profile life until his alleged involvement in the shooting.

In February 1995, the Royal Malaysia Police successfully secured the whereabouts of the gunman, who was actually hiding in the Malaysian state of Johor. The suspected shooter and his girlfriend were both arrested inside the girlfriend's house at Segamat District, a town in Johor, and both the revolver and 20 live rounds of ammunition were recovered by the Malaysian police. The gunman, a 63-year-old Singaporean taxi driver named Tay Chin Wah, was charged in a Malaysian court for illegal possession of weapons. He reportedly confessed to the Malaysian investigators about the shooting incident and how he procured the gun. The Singapore Police Force, who were notified of Tay's arrest and confession, found out that Tay illegally purchased the gun in Singapore for S$2,000, and they promised to investigate the case further and facilitate Tay's extradition in the mean time, and they confirmed that Tay was the gunman they sought after.

However, Tay was not immediately extradited back to Singapore upon his arrest in Malaysia. Instead, he was incarcerated at a Malaysian prison for a criminal offence, before he was released within the next five years, and handed over to the Singaporean authorities to face indictment over the shooting incident.

At the time of his arrest, Tay was a taxi driver who had gangland affiliations and also dabbled in illegal opium trafficking. He also frequented the area of Jalan Besar, where he often gamble at illegal gambling dens, and he also operated an illegal opium den for addicts to go and smoke opium. Tay was married for about 50 years and has eight children, although none of them were present in court during Tay's trial proceedings.

== Trial of Tay Chin Wah ==
On 18 February 2001, after his return to Singapore, Tay Chin Wah, then 68 years old, officially stood trial at the High Court for one count of illegally discharging a firearm under the Arms Offences Act, which mandated the death sentence for this particular offence if found guilty. Tay was represented by both Chua Eng Hui and Ong Cheong Wei, while the prosecution was led by Raymond Fong and Chew Siong Tai. Justice Kan Ting Chiu was appointed as the trial judge of Tay's case.

The trial court was told that Tay's girlfriend, whose name was Lee Ah Kai (aged 48 in 1995), alias Susan Lee, had borrowed S$1,000 from the first victim Lee Yang Ping, and Soh Keng Ho, the other victim, served as her guarantor. After she took the loan, Susan defaulted on her repayment and on the date of the shooting, when both Susan and Tay were at a void deck in Rowell Road, she was confronted by both Lee and Soh, who demanded Susan to repay the loan, and Susan was unable to pay up. A quarrel broke out between them, and Tay became involved in the argument as well. Based on the prosecution's case and Tay's own admission, Tay took out the revolver and fired at both Lee and Soh, who ran away at the sight of the gun, and it caused Lee to be injured. Both Soh and Lee came to court to testify against Tay, and Dr Teo Teng Poh, a Principal Scientific Officer of the Department of Scientific Services, also testified that the bullets directed at the two men indeed came from Tay's revolver.

Tay elected to give his evidence on the stand, and while Tay pleaded guilty at first, which was not allowed in Singapore for criminal charges that carried the death penalty, he told the court that he bought the gun in 1983, 12 years before the shooting, and it was sold to him by a Thai opium trafficker for a price of S$2,000, which also included the ammunition. Tay said that on the day of the shooting, he brought the revolver along for self-defense while accompanying his girlfriend to meet both Lee and Soh, in an effort to meditate and discuss on her debt. However, the meeting escalated into a heated dispute, and one of the men allegedly choked Tay's girlfriend on the neck, and it caused Tay to brandish his sidearm and fired once at the ceiling of the void deck, in order to frighten the duo. This caused Lee and Soh to flee the scene, and still simmering with rage over his girlfriend's predicament, Tay fired three more shots at both Lee and Soh, and although the two men were not killed, Lee was injured on the buttocks. After the shooting, Tay and his girlfriend went to board a taxi and left for Malaysia, where he was eventually arrested for the case.

On 21 February 2001, after a trial lasting three days, Justice Kan Ting Chiu delivered his verdict. He found that Tay had not rebutted the legal presumption that he intended to cause harm when he opened fire at both Soh and Lee. He stated that when Tay pointed the gun at both men and fired at them out of anger, there was no doubt that Tay had intentionally discharged the firearm at the both of them, and it could be further interpreted as him having the intent to cause injury or death by doing so, rather than him firing the gun with nothing on his mind. On these grounds, Justice Kan ruled that the prosecution had proven its case beyond a reasonable doubt.

Therefore, 68-year-old Tay Chin Wah was found guilty of unlawfully discharging his firearm under Section 4(1) of the Arms Offences Act (Chapter 14), and sentenced to death by hanging.

== Appeal ==
On 2 May 2001, Tay Chin Wah lost his appeal against both his conviction and mandatory death sentence. The Court of Appeal's three judges - Chief Justice Yong Pung How, and two Judges of Appeal L P Thean (Thean Lip Ping) and Chao Hick Tin - stated that Tay had not rebutted the legal presumption that he intended to cause harm when he fired the four shots, or at least the three subsequent shots he directed towards the two victims Lee Yang Ping and Soh Keng Ho, and the evidence was sufficient to prove the firearm charge against Tay beyond a reasonable doubt. Noting that the defence did not make any submissions on appeal, the appellate court decided that there was nothing to exculpate Tay and hence upheld his conviction and sentence.

== Execution ==
On 26 October 2001, 68-year-old Tay Chin Wah was hanged in Changi Prison at dawn. On the same date when Tay was executed, 26-year-old Jimmy Goh Chye Soon was put to death at the same prison for one count of trafficking 81.73 grams of diamorphine. Goh, who was arrested in May 2000 for the crime, received the death penalty in December 2000, and like Tay, he also lost his appeal prior to his execution.

== See also ==
- Arms Offences Act
- Capital punishment in Singapore
- List of major crimes in Singapore
