= Lau Chi Sing =

23 year old male Hong Konger executed in Singapore for heroin trafficking in 1989

- 劉志成
- Lau after his arrest in 1984
- Born: 1 January 1966; Hong Kong
- Died: 17 November 1989 (aged 23); Changi Prison, Singapore
- Citizenship: British Dependent Territories citizen
- Occupation: Motor mechanic
- Status: Executed
- Conviction: Drug trafficking
- Penalty: Death

Chinese name
- Chinese: 刘志成
- Hanyu Pinyin: Liú Zhìchéng
- Jyutping: lau^{4} zi^{3} sing^{4}

Lau Chi Sing (Chinese: 劉志成; Jyutping: lau^{4} zi^{3} sing^{4}; 1 January 1966 – 17 November 1989) was a 23 year old male Hong Kong resident executed in Singapore for drug trafficking. He was the first Hongkonger to be executed in Singapore since its independence and also the first drug mule to be sentenced to death for trafficking narcotics via Changi Airport.

After purportedly being recruited to work as a courier for a Hong Kong based drug trafficking organization, Lau was arrested while in possession of almost a quarter of a kilogram of high-quality heroin after checking in for a flight at Singapore's Changi Airport.

Despite vehemently protesting his innocence and stating that he was tricked into smuggling narcotics, Lau was found guilty at trial and sentenced to death, with the Singaporean authorities being ultimately undeterred by pleas for clemency.

== Biography ==
Born in British Hong Kong in 1966, Lau Chi Sing was working as a motor mechanic at the time of his arrest.

== Arrest at Changi Airport ==
Having previously travelled from Bangkok via Kuala Lumpur to Singapore, on 16 October 1984 Lau left the Ghim Pang Hotel in Geylang Road and caught a taxi cab to Changi Airport. He was to catch a flight to Vienna, with the final destination being Amsterdam. He was arrested after he checked in for his flight at 7:55pm, and a search of his belongings uncovered 242 grams of heroin concealed in dry cell batteries.

In connection with Lau's arrest, three other Hong Kong residents were arrested at the same time, one in Don Mueang International Airport in Bangkok and two at Subang Airport in Kuala Lumpur, in a coordinated operation between the Central Narcotics Bureau of Singapore and associated anti narcotic agencies in Thailand and Malaysia. On 19 October 1984 Lau was officially charged with trafficking heroin and sent froward for trial.

== Trial ==
On 25 May 1987, the prosecution described how Lau was under surveillance by Central Narcotics Bureau officers (acting on tip off) as soon as he left his hotel. He was then approached by officials after he received his boarding pass in the Departures hall of the airport. Senior narcotics officer Jamaludin Salleh testified that just as he was about to examine a radio cassette player the defendant was carrying, Lau pressed the 'Play' button to prove that it worked, which aroused the officer's suspicion.

When officer Jamaludin Salleh removed the dry cell batteries from the radio and threw one on the ground, the cap popped off and a white powder spilled out. The caps of all the other batteries were then removed and they also had white powder inside. Tests later confirmed the white powder was heroin, and the 8 batteries contained a total of 242 grams with an estimated value of $290,000. Further examination of the batteries found a small button cell battery inside each hollow shell, which had allowed the cassette recorder to power on for a short time period.

Lau testified in his defence that he thought he was smuggling diamonds and did not know the batteries contained illegal drugs. Six months before his arrest, he claimed to have been approached by a man named Low Fu Chye in Hong Kong, who asked if he wanted to earn some money "smuggling things", which he thought to mean stolen jewelry. He would never have smuggled drugs, as they ruined lives and also because he was aware of the death penalty for drug trafficking in Singapore and Malaysia. At a later meeting with Low Fu Chye in Bangkok, he was shown some jewelry and loose diamonds, which he thought were the "things" he was to be paid HK$10,000 for smuggling to Amsterdam. He did not check the contents of the batteries, which he claimed were subsequently handed to him on board a plane in Thailand, as he trusted Low.

== Legal challenge to Trafficking charge ==
On 27 May 1987, Justice Lai Kew Chai and Justice L.P. Thean asked Deputy Public Prosecutor Ismail Hamid and defence council Joseph Gray to make submissions on whether Lau had in fact 'trafficked' the 242 grams of heroin, as he had intended to take the drug outside of Singapore, and if such an act amounted to 'transporting' within Section 5 of the Misuse of Drugs Act. A legal decision by the Privy Council in London from 1980 ruled that the mere act of moving drugs did not amount to trafficking, it must also be proved that they were being moved for the transfer of possession to another person at their final destination. The Privy Council was previously the highest court of final appeal in Singapore for all cases involving the death penalty, until a change in the law in April 1994.

On 29 May 1987, defence council Joseph Gray submitted that even if Lau knew the batteries contained drugs, they were only being transported to the airport to be disposed of in Europe. The drugs were moved, but they never changed hands, therefore they were not 'trafficked'. Also, the law only applied to the transfer of drugs to another person in Singapore and not to any activity outside its territorial jurisdiction. Deputy Public Prosecutor Ismail Hamid countered that under the Misuse of Drugs Act, anyone caught transporting more than 2 grams of heroin would be presumed to have the drug for the purpose of trafficking, unless proved otherwise in a court of law. The only way an accused person could rebut this presumption would be to satisfy the court that he had the drugs for his own consumption. In Lau's case, he was caught red handed transporting the drugs from one point to another with the intention of transferring possession to another person at an end destination. The fact the recipient was not in Singapore, or that Lau never got to successfully hand over the drugs, was irrelevant to whether he was innocent or guilty to the crime of trafficking drugs.

== Verdict ==
On 25 November 1987, Lau was found guilty as charged and sentenced to death for trafficking 242 grams of heroin, contrary to Section 5 of the Misuse of Drugs Act. In its 16 page judgement, the High Court made a landmark ruling that any person caught transporting drugs for distribution would be guilty of trafficking, even if they are only transiting via Singapore and have no intention of unloading the drugs within its borders. Referring to the earlier Privy Council judgement, Justice Thean pointed out that the test for determining if an act of transporting a drug from one destination to another amounted to trafficking depended on the reason why the drug was being moved. If the reason was to distribute it to one or more persons, then the act was considered trafficking, therefore it was irrelevant whether the intended distribution took place in Singapore itself or overseas. Lau's case was not concerned with the act of distribution, but the act of transporting the drugs for the purpose of distribution, irrespective of the purpose is achieved or not and irrespective of the intended final destination.

== Appeal ==
On 11 July 1988, the Appeals court upheld the earlier High Court ruling sentencing Lau to death. Lau's defence team had argued that his conviction for trafficking was invalid as the intended recipient of the drugs was not in Singapore, and that the original trial judge had erred in dismissing his claims he thought that the batteries actually contained diamonds. However, the appeal court judges ruled that since the drugs were transported by Lau for the purpose of distribution, it was irrelevant whether the intended distribution was to take place in Singapore itself or overseas, thus the trafficking conviction was correct. Also, the court ruled that Lau had failed to rebut the presumption of knowledge of the nature of the narcotics he was caught with while under cross examination during his original trial, therefore there was no reason to grant his appeal on that either.

== Execution ==
Lau Chi Sing was hanged at Changi prison on the morning of 17 November 1989. He was the 25th person to be executed for drug trafficking since 1975 when the death sentence was first introduced and mandated as the punishment for drug trafficking.

== See also ==
- Capital punishment for drug trafficking
- Capital punishment in Singapore
