= List of executions in Singapore =

Deaths by capital punishment in Singapore

Capital punishment is a legal penalty in Singapore. Thirty-three offences—including murder, drug trafficking, terrorism, use of firearms and kidnapping—warrant the death penalty under Singaporean law.

The following is a list of known people executed in the Republic of Singapore since Singapore's independence in 1965. All executions have been carried out by hanging at Changi Prison.

== List of people executed since 1965 ==
As the Singaporean government does not release statistics on the use of capital punishment, this is not an exhaustive list of prisoners executed in independent Singapore, and is not meant to be a reference for the total number of prisoners who have been executed in Singapore since independence. There are no official collated figures available for executions in Singapore, and this list has been compiled from multiple sources.

No.	Name	Age	Sex	Nationality	Date of execution	Crime	Victim(s)/Amount of Drugs	President
1	Tan Kheng Ann	53	M	Singapore	29 October 1965	Multiple Murders (Pulau Senang prison riots)	Daniel Dutton	Yusof Ishak
2	Chia Yeow Fatt	24	M	Singapore	29 October 1965	Multiple Murders (Pulau Senang prison riots)	Daniel Dutton	Yusof Ishak
3	Cheong Wai Sang	51	M	Singapore	29 October 1965	Multiple Murders (Pulau Senang prison riots)	Daniel Dutton	Yusof Ishak
4	Somasundram Subramaniam	32	M	Singapore	29 October 1965	Multiple Murders (Pulau Senang prison riots)	Daniel Dutton	Yusof Ishak
5	Lim Tee Kang	32	M	Singapore	29 October 1965	Multiple Murders (Pulau Senang prison riots)	Daniel Dutton	Yusof Ishak
6	Somasundarajoo Vengdasalam	44	M	Singapore	29 October 1965	Multiple Murders (Pulau Senang prison riots)	Daniel Dutton	Yusof Ishak
7	Lim Kim Chuan	38	M	Singapore	29 October 1965	Multiple Murders (Pulau Senang prison riots)	Arumugam Veerasingham	Yusof Ishak
8	Khoo Geok San	49	M	Singapore	29 October 1965	Multiple Murders (Pulau Senang prison riots)	Arumugam Veerasingham	Yusof Ishak
9	Chan Wah	22	M	Singapore	29 October 1965	Multiple Murders (Pulau Senang prison riots)	Arumugam Veerasingham	Yusof Ishak
10	Hoe Hock Hai	24	M	Singapore	29 October 1965	Multiple Murders (Pulau Senang prison riots)	Arumugam Veerasingham	Yusof Ishak
11	Ponapalam Govindasamy	27	M	Singapore	29 October 1965	Multiple Murders (Pulau Senang prison riots)	Chok Kok Hong	Yusof Ishak
12	Chew Seng Hoe	26	M	Singapore	29 October 1965	Multiple Murders (Pulau Senang prison riots)	Chok Kok Hong	Yusof Ishak
13	Chew Thiam Huat	30	M	Singapore	29 October 1965	Multiple Murders (Pulau Senang prison riots)	Chok Kok Hong	Yusof Ishak
14	Sim Hoe Seng	45	M	Singapore	29 October 1965	Multiple Murders (Pulau Senang prison riots)	Chok Kok Hong	Yusof Ishak
15	Ng Cheng Liong	34	M	Singapore	29 October 1965	Multiple Murders (Pulau Senang prison riots)	Tan Kok Hian	Yusof Ishak
16	Tan Yin Chwee	38	M	Singapore	29 October 1965	Multiple Murders (Pulau Senang prison riots)	Tan Kok Hian	Yusof Ishak
17	Sim Teck Beng	20	M	Singapore	29 October 1965	Multiple Murders (Pulau Senang prison riots)	Tan Kok Hian	Yusof Ishak
18	Cheng Poh Kheng	53	M	Singapore	29 October 1965	Multiple Murders (Pulau Senang prison riots)	Tan Kok Hian	Yusof Ishak
19	Sunny Ang	28	M	Singapore	6 February 1967	Murder	Jenny Cheok	Yusof Ishak
20	Usman bin Haji Muhammad Ali	25	M	Indonesia	17 October 1968	Multiple Murders (MacDonald House bombing)	Elizabeth Suzie Choo, Juliet Koh, and Mohammed Yasin bin Kesit	Yusof Ishak
21	Harun Thohir	25	M	Indonesia	17 October 1968	Multiple Murders (MacDonald House bombing)	Elizabeth Suzie Choo, Juliet Koh, and Mohammed Yasin bin Kesit	Yusof Ishak
22	Lim Heng Soon	30	M	Singapore	5 February 1970	Murder	D. Munusamy	Yusof Ishak
23	Low Ngah Ngah	31	M	Singapore	5 February 1970	Murder	D. Munusamy	Yusof Ishak
24	Teo Cheng Leong	38	M	Singapore	May 5 1971	Armed Robbery	N/A	Benjamin Sheares
25	Liew Kim Siong	23	M	Singapore	8 August 1972	Murder (Upper Bukit Timah factory murders)	Kan Sze Hing and Leung Fung	Benjamin Sheares
26	Kee Ah Tee	22	M	Singapore	8 August 1972	Murder (Upper Bukit Timah factory murders)	Kan Sze Hing and Leung Fung	Benjamin Sheares
27	Lee Chor Pet	29	M	Singapore	27 January 1973	Kidnapping and Murder	Ong Beang Leck	Benjamin Sheares
28	Lim Kim Kwee	37	M	Malaysia	27 January 1973	Kidnapping and Murder	Ong Beang Leck	Benjamin Sheares
29	Ho Kee Fatt	28	M	Malaysia	27 January 1973	Kidnapping and Murder	Ong Beang Leck	Benjamin Sheares
30	Osman bin Ali	34	M	Indonesia	27 July 1973	Murder	Tan Tai Hin and Wu Tee	Benjamin Sheares
31	Mimi Wong Weng Siu	34	F	Singapore	27 July 1973	Murder	Ayako Watanabe	Benjamin Sheares
32	Sim Woh Kum	40	M	Singapore	27 July 1973	Murder	Ayako Watanabe	Benjamin Sheares
33	Chow Kim Hoong	23	M	Malaysia	3 August 1973	Murder	Kwong Sau Lan	Benjamin Sheares
34	Andrew Chou Hock Guan	34	M	Singapore	28 February 1975	Multiple Murders (Gold Bars triple murders)	Ngo Cheng Poh, Ang Boon Chai, and Leong Chin Woo	Benjamin Sheares
35	David Chou Hock Heng	38	M	Singapore	28 February 1975	Multiple Murders (Gold Bars triple murders)	Ngo Cheng Poh, Ang Boon Chai, and Leong Chin Woo	Benjamin Sheares
36	Peter Lim Swee Guan	28	M	Singapore	28 February 1975	Multiple Murders (Gold Bars triple murders)	Ngo Cheng Poh, Ang Boon Chai, and Leong Chin Woo	Benjamin Sheares
37	Alex Yau Hean Thye	23	M	Singapore	28 February 1975	Multiple Murders (Gold Bars triple murders)	Ngo Cheng Poh, Ang Boon Chai, and Leong Chin Woo	Benjamin Sheares
38	Stephen Francis	24	M	Singapore	28 February 1975	Multiple Murders (Gold Bars triple murders)	Ngo Cheng Poh, Ang Boon Chai, and Leong Chin Woo	Benjamin Sheares
39	Richard James	22	M	Singapore	28 February 1975	Multiple Murders (Gold Bars triple murders)	Ngo Cheng Poh, Ang Boon Chai, and Leong Chin Woo	Benjamin Sheares
40	Konesekaram Nagalingam	22	M	Singapore	28 February 1975	Multiple Murders (Gold Bars triple murders)	Ngo Cheng Poh, Ang Boon Chai, and Leong Chin Woo	Benjamin Sheares
41	Ismail bin U. K. Abdul Rahman	28	M	Singapore	28 February 1975	Murder	Karuppan Velusamy	Benjamin Sheares
42	Chelliah Silvanathan	23	M	Singapore	11 April 1975	Murder	Arumugam Jayamani	Benjamin Sheares
43	Lim Kim Huat	27	M	Malaysia	27 June 1975	Murder	Chew Liew Tea	Benjamin Sheares
44	Neoh Bean Chye	31	M	Malaysia	27 June 1975	Murder	Chew Liew Tea	Benjamin Sheares
45	Liew Ah Chiew	21	M	Singapore	28 November 1975	Murder	Hor Koon Seng	Benjamin Sheares
46	Pehn Kwan Jin	27	M	Singapore	16 April 1976	Murder	Tan Eng Kim	Benjamin Sheares
47	K. Vijayan Krishnan	24	M	Malaysia	30 April 1976	Murder	Ahora Murthi Krishnasamy	Benjamin Sheares
48	Sha Bakar Dawood (Note: He was the first person in Singapore to be executed under the Arms Offences Act)	38	M	Singapore	3 September 1976	Discharge of a Firearm	Tan Tai Meng and Wong Meng Seng	Benjamin Sheares
49	Nadarajah Govindasamy	61	M	Singapore	28 January 1977	Murder	Mohamed Azad	Benjamin Sheares
50	Talib bin Haji Hamzah	23	M	Malaysia	28 January 1977	Accomplice to an Armed Robbery	N/A	Benjamin Sheares
51	Teh Sin Tong (Note: He was the first person in Singapore to be executed under the Misuse of Drugs Act)	25	M	Malaysia	28 April 1978	Drug Trafficking	254.7g of diamorphine	Benjamin Sheares
52	Lee Keng Guan	27	M	Singapore	11 May 1979	Discharge of a Firearm	Low Meng How	Benjamin Sheares
53	Wong Loke Fatt	24	M	Singapore	11 May 1979	Discharge of a Firearm	Low Meng How	Benjamin Sheares
54	Ho Joo Huat	23	M	Singapore	11 May 1979	Discharge of a Firearm	Low Meng How	Benjamin Sheares
55	Visuvanathan Thillai Kannu	27	M	Malaysia	25 May 1979	Murder	Madikum Puspanathan	Benjamin Sheares
56	Teo Hock Seng	26	M	Malaysia	29 June 1979	Drug Trafficking	46 grams of pure heroin	Benjamin Sheares
57	Tay Eng Whatt	26	M	Singapore	29 July 1979	Murder	Wong Thng Kiat	Benjamin Sheares
58	Wong Kee Chin	29	M	Singapore	5 October 1979	Drug Trafficking	138 grams of pure heroin	Benjamin Sheares
59	Lee Kin Kheong	27	M	Singapore	20 October 1979	Drug Trafficking	40g of heroin	Benjamin Sheares
60	Lim Hong Yap	34	M	Singapore	2 November 1979	Drug Trafficking	1.03 kg of heroin	Benjamin Sheares
61	Chang Bock Eng	34	M	Singapore	9 May 1980	Discharge of a Firearm (1976 Balestier Road shooting)	Neo Koon San	Benjamin Sheares
62	Tay Cher Kiang	31	M	Singapore	9 May 1980	Discharge of a Firearm (1976 Balestier Road shooting)	Neo Koon San	Benjamin Sheares
63	Quek Kee Siong	44	M	Singapore	28 November 1980	Rape and Murder	Cheng Geok Ha	Benjamin Sheares
64	Ong Ah Chuan	27	M	Singapore	20 February 1981	Drug Trafficking	209.84 grams of pure heroin	Benjamin Sheares
65	Koh Chai Cheng	29	M	Malaysia	27 March 1981	Drug Trafficking	1.2 kg of pure heroin	Benjamin Sheares
66	Azml Anis Ahmad	32	M	India	27 March 1981	Drug Traffficking	75 grams of pure heroin	Benjamin Sheares
67	Low Hong Eng	35	F	Singapore	9 October 1981	Drug Trafficking	459.3 grams of pure heroin	Yeoh Ghim Seng
68	Tan Ah Tee	35	M	Singapore	9 October 1981	Drug Trafficking	459.3 grams of pure heroin	Yeoh Ghim Seng
69	Kalidass Sinnathamby Narayanasamy	29	M	Singapore	?? 1982	Rape and Murder	Usharani Ganaison	Devan Nair
70	Haw Tua Tau	41	M	Singapore	?? 1982	Murder	Phoon Ah Leong and Hu Yuen Keng	Devan Nair
71	Vadivelu Kathikesan	28	M	Singapore	29 January 1983	Murder	Abdul Rahiman Adnan and Mohamed Dawood Abdul Jaffar	Devan Nair
72	Anwar Ali Khan	25	M	Singapore	4 March 1983	Drug Trafficking	43 grams of pure heroin	Devan Nair
73	Lim Chuan Keam	34	M	Malaysia	21 October 1983	Drug Trafficking	154 grams of pure heroin	Devan Nair
74	Chia Beng Chye	21	M	Singapore	20 January 1984	Drug Trafficking	112g of heroin	Devan Nair
75	Ong Hwee Kuan	26	M	Singapore	24 February 1984	Robbery and Murder	Lee Kim Lai and Chew Theng Hin	Devan Nair
76	Ong Chin Hock	26	M	Singapore	24 February 1984	Robbery and Murder	Lee Kim Lai and Chew Theng Hin	Devan Nair
77	Yeo Ching Boon	26	M	Singapore	24 February 1984	Robbery and Murder	Lee Kim Lai and Chew Theng Hin	Devan Nair
78	Lim Kok Yew	25	M	Malaysia	8 June 1984	Discharge of a Firearm	N/A	Devan Nair
79	Murugaya Rajendran	28	M	Singapore	14 September 1984	Drug Trafficking	332 grams of heroin	Devan Nair
80	Leo Hai Hock	22	M	Singapore	2 August 1985	Drug Trafficking	182 grams of pure heroin	Yeoh Ghim Seng
81	Tan Ah Leng	22	M	Singapore	31 January 1986	Drug Trafficking	27 grams of pure heroin	Wee Kim Wee
82	Sim Min Teck	24	M	Singapore	23 July 1986	Murder	Lee Cheng Tiong and Teo Keng Siang	Wee Kim Wee
83	Ramu Annadavascan	27	M	Singapore	19 September 1986	Murder	Kalingam Mariappan	Wee Kim Wee
84	Wong Foot Ling	34	M	Singapore	19 September 1986	Murder	Khor Gek Hong	Wee Kim Wee
85	Lau Ah Kiang	33	M	Singapore	21 January 1988	Murder	Ong Ai Siok	Wee Kim Wee
86	Adrian Lim	46	M	Singapore	25 November 1988	Murder (Toa Payoh ritual murders)	Agnes Ng Siew Heok and Ghazali bin Marzuki	Wee Kim Wee
87	Tan Mui Choo	34	F	Singapore	25 November 1988	Murder (Toa Payoh ritual murders)	Agnes Ng Siew Heok and Ghazali bin Marzuki	Wee Kim Wee
88	Hoe Kah Hong	33	F	Malaysia	25 November 1988	Murder (Toa Payoh ritual murders)	Agnes Ng Siew Heok and Ghazali bin Marzuki	Wee Kim Wee
89	Sek Kim Wah	23	M	Singapore	9 December 1988	Multiple Murders (Andrew Road triple murder)	5 murder victims (Note: The 5 victims were: Jacinta Tay Aishan, Jovita Sandrina Virador, Annie Low Au Ie, Lim Khee Sin, and Ong Ah Hong.)	Wee Kim Wee
90	Tan Sek Cheong	29	M	Malaysia	12 May 1989	Drug Trafficking	103 grams of heroin	Wee Kim Wee
91	Law How Chai	28	M	Malaysia	12 May 1989	Drug Trafficking	103 grams of heroin	Wee Kim Wee
92	Ng Beng Kee	37	M	Singapore	26 May 1989	Drug Trafficking	20 kg of heroin	Wee Kim Wee
93	Tan Hock Bin	34	M	Singapore	26 May 1989	Drug Trafficking	20 kg of heroin	Wee Kim Wee
93	Lau Chi Sing	23	M	British Hong Kong	17 November 1989	Drug Trafficking	242 grams of heroin	Wee Kim Wee
94	Ho Cheng Kwee	27	M	Singapore	19 January 1990	Drug Trafficking	144 grams of heroin	Wee Kim Wee
95	Teo Boon Ann	30	M	Singapore	20 April 1990	Murder	Chong Kin Meng	Wee Kim Wee
96	Lim Beng Hai	33	M	Singapore	5 October 1990	Multiple Murders (Ang Mo Kio family murders)	Soh Lee Lee, Jeremy Yeong Yin Kit, and Joyce Yeong Pei Ling	Wee Kim Wee
97	Goh Ah Lim	24	M	Singapore	6 September 1991	Drug Trafficking	1.5 kg of heroin	Wee Kim Wee
98	Tan Cheow Bock	39	M	Singapore	21 September 1991	Murder	Chia Chun Fong	Wee Kim Wee
99	Chia Chee Yeen	22	M	Singapore	3 October 1991	Murder	Daniel De Rozario	Wee Kim Wee
100	Tan Leong Chay	23	M	Singapore	15 November 1991	Drug Trafficking	1.777 kg of heroin	Wee Kim Wee
101	Lim Kheng Boon	23	M	Malaysia	15 November 1991	Drug Trafficking	1.777 kg of heroin	Wee Kim Wee
102	Mohamed Yusoh Esa	26	M	Malaysia	15 November 1991	Drug Trafficking	1.777 kg of heroin	Wee Kim Wee
103	Kadir Awang	36	M	Singapore	29 November 1991	Drug Trafficking	50g of heroin	Wee Kim Wee
104	Tan Toon Hock	35	M	Malaysia	28 February 1992	Drug Trafficking	423g of heroin	Wee Kim Wee
105	Lim Joo Yin	38	M	Singapore	3 April 1992	Drug Trafficking	1.37 kg of heroin	Wee Kim Wee
106	Ronald Tan Chong Ngee	37	M	Singapore	3 April 1992	Drug Trafficking	1.37 kg of heroin	Wee Kim Wee
107	Hensley Anthony Neville	35	M	Malaysia	28 August 1992	Rape and Murder	Lim Hwee Huang	Wee Kim Wee
108	Tan Boon Tat	27	M	Singapore	25 September 1992	Drug Trafficking	1.12 kg of heroin	Wee Kim Wee
109	Lim Ah Poh	32	M	Malaysia	25 September 1992	Drug Trafficking	220g of heroin	Wee Kim Wee
110	Vasavan Sathiadew	26	M	Singapore	23 October 1992	Murder	Tan Tik Siah	Wee Kim Wee
111	Phan Khenapin	26	M	Thailand	23 October 1992	Murder	Tan Tik Siah	Wee Kim Wee
112	Wan Pathong	30	M	Thailand	23 October 1992	Murder	Tan Tik Siah	Wee Kim Wee
113	Ng Chong Teck	35	M	Singapore	30 October 1992	Drug Trafficking	50g of heroin	Wee Kim Wee
114	Tan Joo Cheng	39	M	Singapore	12 November 1992	Robbery and Murder	Lee Juay Heng	Wee Kim Wee
115	Loh Yoon Seong	37	M	Malaysia	?? June 1993	Murder	Nurdin Nguan Song	Wee Kim Wee
116	Mohamed Bachu Miah	33	M	Bangladesh	23 July 1993	Murder	Mohamed Shafiqul Islam	Wee Kim Wee
117	Mohamed Mahmuduzzaman Khan	29	M	Bangladesh	23 July 1993	Murder	Mohamed Shafiqul Islam	Wee Kim Wee
118	Raymond Ko Mun Cheung	22	M	British Hong Kong	30 July 1993	Drug Trafficking	2 kg of heroin	Wee Kim Wee
119	An Man Keny Chiu Sum Hing	26	M	British Hong Kong	30 July 1993	Drug Trafficking	2 kg of heroin	Wee Kim Wee
120	Yap Biew Hian	25	M	Malaysia	10 October 1993	Murder	Wong Mee Hiong	Ong Teng Cheong
121	Maksa Tohaiee	21	M	Singapore	26 November 1993	Murder	Clementina Curci	Ong Teng Cheong
122	Ng Soo Hin	23	M	Singapore	16 December 1993	Murder	Ng Lee Kheng and Foo Chin Chin	Ong Teng Cheong
123	Ithinin Kamari	39	M	Singapore	23 December 1993	Murder	Mohamed Johar Selamat and Mohd Said Abdul Majid	Ong Teng Cheong
124	Wong Wai Hung	21	M	British Hong Kong	21 January 1994	Drug Trafficking	4.6 kg of heroin	Ong Teng Cheong
125	Tan Nguan Siah	23	M	Singapore	21 January 1994	Drug Trafficking	46 grams of pure heroin	Ong Teng Cheong
126	Mazlan Maidun	29	M	Singapore	21 January 1994	Murder	Yeu Lam Ching	Ong Teng Cheong
127	Ng Kwok Chun	32	M	British Hong Kong	28 January 1994	Drug Trafficking	2.3 kg of heroin	Ong Teng Cheong
128	Hsui Wing Cheung	37	M	British Hong Kong	28 January 1994	Drug Trafficking	2.5 kg of heroin	Ong Teng Cheong
129	Lee Ngin Kiat	57	M	Singapore	28 January 1994	Drug Trafficking	147 grams of heroin	Ong Teng Cheong
130	Gan Kok Cheng	41	M	Malaysia	4 February 1994	Drug Trafficking	106 grams of heroin	Ong Teng Cheong
131	Cheuk Mei Mei	29	F	British Hong Kong	4 March 1994	Drug Trafficking	2 kg of heroin	Ong Teng Cheong
132	Tse Po Chung	31	M	British Hong Kong	4 March 1994	Drug Trafficking	2 kg of heroin	Ong Teng Cheong
133	Fung Yuk Shing	28	M	British Hong Kong	4 March 1994	Drug Trafficking	3 kg of heroin	Ong Teng Cheong
134	Manit Changthong	32	M	Thailand	4 March 1994	Drug Trafficking	3 kg of heroin	Ong Teng Cheong
135	Yeo Watt Song	42	M	Singapore	10 March 1994	Murder	Ho Hon Sing	Ong Teng Cheong
136	Krishnan Varadan	29	M	Malaysia	15 April 1994	Murder	Packiria Pillai Krishnasamy	Ong Teng Cheong
137	Koh Aik Siew	40	M	Singapore	15 April 1994	Drug Trafficking	680g of heroin	Ong Teng Cheong
138	Hanafiah Bin Bedullah	26	M	Malaysia	13 May 1994	Drug Trafficking	2.5 kg of cannabis	Ong Teng Cheong
139	Mat Repin Mamat	40	M	Malaysia	13 May 1994	Drug Trafficking	1 kg of cannabis	Ong Teng Cheong
140	Lai Kam Loy	27	M	Malaysia	13 May 1994	Drug Trafficking	200 grams of heroin	Ong Teng Cheong
141	Tee Seh Ping	26	M	Malaysia	13 May 1994	Drug Trafficking	200 grams of heroin	Ong Teng Cheong
142	Yeo Choon Chau	23	M	Malaysia	13 May 1994	Drug Trafficking	200 grams of heroin	Ong Teng Cheong
143	Yeo Choon Poh	26	M	Malaysia	13 May 1994	Drug Trafficking	200 grams of heroin	Ong Teng Cheong
144	Goh Hong Choon	26	M	Singapore	29 July 1994	Murder	Kuah Bee Hong	Ong Teng Cheong
145	Ibrahim bin Masod	55	M	Singapore	29 July 1994	Kidnapping and Murder	Phang Tee Wah	Ong Teng Cheong
146	Lee Teck Sang	24	M	Singapore	29 July 1994	Robbery and Murder	Tan Chin Liong	Ong Teng Cheong
147	Hyicenth Ihejirika	59	M	Nigeria	29 July 1994	Drug Trafficking	2.7 kg of heroin	Ong Teng Cheong
148	Samsuri Mohamed Yus	42	M	Singapore	29 July 1994	Drug Trafficking	2.9 kg of cannabis	Ong Teng Cheong
149	Gabriel Okonkwo	33	M	Nigeria	5 August 1994	Drug Trafficking	538 grams of heroin	Ong Teng Cheong
150	Paul Okechukwu Ngwudo	29	M	Nigeria	5 August 1994	Drug Trafficking	538 grams of heroin	Ong Teng Cheong
151	Lim Swee Thong	43	M	Singapore	5 August 1994	Drug Trafficking	24.91 grams of heroin	Ong Teng Cheong
152	Mohamed Jaafar Abidin	32	M	Singapore	26 August 1994	Robbery and Murder	Sukarti Amari	Ong Teng Cheong
153	Yacob Rusmatullah	37	M	Singapore	26 August 1994	Robbery and Murder	Sukarti Amari	Ong Teng Cheong
154	Emmanuel Anyanwu	33	M	Nigeria	26 August 1994	Drug Trafficking	2.2 kg of heroin	Ong Teng Cheong
155	Lu Lai Heng	31	M	Singapore	9 September 1994	Drug Trafficking	525g of heroin	Ong Teng Cheong
156	Murgan Ramasamy	24	M	Singapore	16 September 1994	Robbery and Murder	Jaswant Singh	Ong Teng Cheong
157	Johannes van Damme	59	M	Netherlands	23 September 1994	Drug Trafficking	4.32 kg of pure heroin	Ong Teng Cheong
158	Goh Lai Wak	39	M	Singapore	30 September 1994	Drug Trafficking	2 kg of heroin	Ong Teng Cheong
159	Abdullah Abdul Rahman	40	M	Singapore	2 October 1994	Drug Trafficking	76 grams of heroin	Ong Teng Cheong
160	Abdul Rashid Mohamed	39	M	Singapore	2 October 1994	Drug Trafficking	76 grams of heroin	Ong Teng Cheong
161	Mufutaw Salam	28	M	Ghana	7 October 1994	Drug Trafficking	2.3 kg of heroin	Ong Teng Cheong
162	Lee Lum Sheun	32	M	Singapore	25 November 1994	Drug Trafficking	66g of heroin	Ong Teng Cheong
163	Ong Yeow Tian	34	M	Singapore	25 November 1994	Murder	Mirza Abdul Halim bin Mirza Abdul Majid	Ong Teng Cheong
164	Kong Weng Chong	56	M	Singapore	9 December 1994	Drug Trafficking	8.25 kg of heroin	Ong Teng Cheong
165	Tan Seang Hock	40	M	Malaysia	9 December 1994	Drug Trafficking	8.25 kg of heroin	Ong Teng Cheong
166	Yeap Kai Pang	38	M	Malaysia	9 December 1994	Drug Trafficking	8.25 kg of heroin	Ong Teng Cheong
167	Elke Tsang Kai-mong	30	F	British Hong Kong	16 December 1994	Drug Trafficking	4 kg of heroin	Ong Teng Cheong
168	Vinit Sopon	38	M	Thailand	16 December 1994	Drug Trafficking	1.4 kg of heroin	Ong Teng Cheong
169	Pairoj Bunsom	30	M	Thailand	16 December 1994	Drug Trafficking	1.4 kg of heroin	Ong Teng Cheong
170	Leong Wing Kong	31	M	Singapore	23 December 1994	Drug Trafficking	50g of heroin	Ong Teng Cheong
171	Lim Choon Chye	38	M	Singapore	23 December 1994	Drug Trafficking	1.7 kg of heroin	Ong Teng Cheong
172	Angel Mou Pui Peng	25	F	Portuguese Macau	6 January 1995	Drug Trafficking	4 kg of heroin	Ong Teng Cheong
173	Ramond Selva Clement	34	M	Malaysia	13 January 1995	Drug Trafficking	105 grams of heroin	Ong Teng Cheong
174	Daniel Chan Chi-pun	38	M	British Hong Kong	10 March 1995	Drug Trafficking	464 grams of heroin	Ong Teng Cheong
175	Flor Contemplacion	42	F	Philippines	17 March 1995	Murder	Delia Mamaril Maga and Nicholas Huang	Ong Teng Cheong
176	Krishna Maikham	32	M	Thailand	17 March 1995	Drug Trafficking	1.2 kg of cannabis	Ong Teng Cheong
177	Don Promphinit	31	M	Thailand	17 March 1995	Drug Trafficking	1.2 kg of cannabis	Ong Teng Cheong
178	Mohammed Nasrul Esyam Shamsudin	21	M	Malaysia	17 March 1995	Drug Trafficking	5 kg of cannabis	Ong Teng Cheong
179	Sylvester Kwaku Forkuo	27	M	Ghana	24 March 1995	Drug Trafficking	576 grams of heroin.	Ong Teng Cheong
180	Ibrahim Yaacob	32	M	Malaysia	24 March 1995	Drug Trafficking	1.39 kg of cannabis	Ong Teng Cheong
181	Goh Hock Huat	30	M	Singapore	24 March 1995	Drug Trafficking	743g of heroin	Ong Teng Cheong
182	Chin Seow Noi	35	M	Malaysia	31 March 1995	Murder	Lim Lee Tin	Ong Teng Cheong
183	Chin Yaw Kim	33	M	Malaysia	31 March 1995	Murder	Lim Lee Tin	Ong Teng Cheong
184	Ng Kim Heng	31	M	Malaysia	31 March 1995	Murder	Lim Lee Tin	Ong Teng Cheong
185	Teoh Kah Lin	30	M	Malaysia	31 March 1995	Drug Trafficking	1.5 kg of heroin	Ong Teng Cheong
186	Tong Ching Man	24	F	British Hong Kong	21 April 1995	Drug Trafficking	1.4 kg of heroin	Ong Teng Cheong
187	Lam Cheuk Wang	24	M	British Hong Kong	21 April 1995	Drug Trafficking	1.4 kg of heroin	Ong Teng Cheong
188	Poon Yuen Chung	22	F	British Hong Kong	21 April 1995	Drug Trafficking	3 kg of heroin	Ong Teng Cheong
189	Chris Chineynye Ubaka	32	M	Nigeria	21 April 1995	Drug Trafficking	7 kg of heroin	Ong Teng Cheong
190	Yeo Hee Seng	34	M	Singapore	21 April 1995	Drug Trafficking	24 grams of heroin	Ong Teng Cheong
191	Kumar Nadison	24	M	Malaysia	28 April 1995	Murder	Samynathan Pawathai	Ong Teng Cheong
192	Jabar Kadermastan	24	M	Malaysia	28 April 1995	Murder	Samynathan Pawathai	Ong Teng Cheong
193	Chandran Gangatharan	27	M	Malaysia	28 April 1995	Murder	Samynathan Pawathai	Ong Teng Cheong
194	Oh Laye Koh	39	M	Singapore	19 May 1995	Murder	Liang Shan Shan	Ong Teng Cheong
195	Hartej Sidhu	35	M	India	19 May 1995	Drug Trafficking	600 grams of heroin and 9.3 kg of opium	Ong Teng Cheong
196	Sarjit Singh	55	M	Singapore	19 May 1995	Drug Trafficking	600 grams of heroin and 9.3 kg of opium	Ong Teng Cheong
197	Sabinus Nkem Okpebie	41	M	Nigeria	26 May 1995	Drug Trafficking	7.5 kg of heroin	Ong Teng Cheong
198	Sukor Abdul Rahman Sidik	20	M	Singapore	26 May 1995	Drug Trafficking	68 grams of heroin	Ong Teng Cheong
199	Wong Kok Men	22	M	Malaysia	26 May 1995	Drug Trafficking	47 grams of heroin	Ong Teng Cheong
200	Lim Yat Kong	23	M	Malaysia	26 May 1995	Drug Trafficking	47 grams of heroin	Ong Teng Cheong
201	Jahabar Bagurudeen	25	M	India	2 June 1995	Murder	Shamsul Hameed	Ong Teng Cheong
202	Yee Kim Yeou	27	M	Malaysia	9 June 1995	Drug Trafficking	1.7 kg of heroin	Ong Teng Cheong
203	Melvin Seet	27	M	Singapore	9 June 1995	Drug Trafficking	1.7 kg of heroin	Ong Teng Cheong
204	Ng Teo Chye	41	M	Singapore	9 June 1995	Drug Trafficking	1.7 kg of heroin	Ong Teng Cheong
205	Tan Siew Chay	48	M	Malaysia	9 June 1995	Drug Trafficking	1.7 kg of heroin	Ong Teng Cheong
206	Mohamad Ashiek Salleh	23	M	Singapore	16 June 1995	Robbery and Murder	Teo Kim Hock and Seing Koo Wan	Ong Teng Cheong
207	Junalis Lumat	24	M	Singapore	16 June 1995	Robbery and Murder	Teo Kim Hock and Seing Koo Wan	Ong Teng Cheong
208	Phua Soy Boon	37	M	Singapore	16 June 1995	Robbery and Murder	Sim Ah Lek	Ong Teng Cheong
209	Chan Hock Wai	27	M	Singapore	16 June 1995	Drug Trafficking	150g of heroin	Ong Teng Cheong
210	Sagar Suppiah Retnam	28	M	Singapore	7 July 1995	Murder	Sivapragasam Subramaniam	Ong Teng Cheong
211	Anbuarsu Joseph	32	M	Singapore	7 July 1995	Murder	Thampusamy Murugian Gunasekaran	Ong Teng Cheong
212	Goh Soon Huat	27	M	Singapore	7 July 1995	Drug Trafficking	69g of heroin	Ong Teng Cheong
213	Ng Theng Shuang	29	M	Malaysia	14 July 1995	Discharge of a Firearm	Karamjit Singh, Ou Kai San and Rosie Kee Lye Choon	Ong Teng Cheong
214	Jamaludin Ibrahim	40	M	Singapore	28 July 1995	Murder	Lau Gek Leng and Luke Yip Khuan	Ong Teng Cheong
215	Govindarajulu Mural	34	M	India	28 July 1995	Drug Trafficking	326g of heroin	Ong Teng Cheong
216	Amrutham Chenchaiah	47	M	Singapore	28 July 1995	Drug Trafficking	326g of heroin	Ong Teng Cheong
217	Tan Yew Lee	36	M	Singapore	25 August 1995	Drug Trafficking	1.447 kg of heroin	Ong Teng Cheong
218	Maniam Rathinswamy	26	M	Singapore	8 September 1995	Murder	Tan Heng Hong	Ong Teng Cheong
219	S. S. Asokan	31	M	Singapore	8 September 1995	Murder	Tan Heng Hong	Ong Teng Cheong
220	Navarat Maykha	33	F	Malaysia	29 September 1995	Drug Trafficking	3.182 kg of heroin	Ong Teng Cheong
221	Indra Wijaya bin Ibrahim	23	M	Singapore	29 September 1995	Robbery and Murder	Loo Kwee Hwa	Ong Teng Cheong
222	Lee Yuan Kwang	25	M	Singapore	10 November 1995	Drug Trafficking	326g of Heroin	Ong Teng Cheong
223	Quek Ah Ling	29	M	Singapore	10 November 1995	Drug Trafficking	326g of Heroin	Ong Teng Cheong
224	Choo Tong Sai	33	M	Singapore	10 November 1995	Drug Trafficking	326g of Heroin	Ong Teng Cheong
225	Yakoob Mohamed	36	M	Singapore	10 November 1995	Drug Trafficking	326g of Heroin	Ong Teng Cheong
226	Panya Marmontree	33	M	Thailand	15 March 1996	Multiple Murders (1992–93 Singapore construction site murders)	Thaung Schwee, Vallaisamy Aryian, and Chokalingam Arumugam	Ong Teng Cheong
227	Prawit Yaowabutr	23	M	Thailand	15 March 1996	Multiple Murders (1992–93 Singapore construction site murders)	Thaung Schwee, Vallaisamy Aryian, and Chokalingam Arumugam	Ong Teng Cheong
228	Manit Wangjaisuk	24	M	Thailand	15 March 1996	Multiple Murders (1992–93 Singapore construction site murders)	Thaung Schwee, Vallaisamy Aryian, and Chokalingam Arumugam	Ong Teng Cheong
229	Panya Amphawa	32	M	Thailand	15 March 1996	Multiple Murders (1992–93 Singapore construction site murders)	Thaung Schwee, Vallaisamy Aryian, and Chokalingam Arumugam	Ong Teng Cheong
230	Prasong Bunsom	30	M	Thailand	15 March 1996	Multiple Murders (1992–93 Singapore construction site murders)	Thaung Schwee, Vallaisamy Aryian, and Chokalingam Arumugam	Ong Teng Cheong
231	Rozman Jusoh	28	M	Malaysia	12 April 1996	Drug Trafficking	2 kg of marijuana	Ong Teng Cheong
232	Razali Mat Zin	29	M	Malaysia	12 April 1996	Drug Trafficking	2 kg of marijuana	Ong Teng Cheong
233	Neo Kay Liang	35	M	Singapore	12 April 1996	Drug Trafficking	20.19g of heroin	Ong Teng Cheong
234	Richard Low Gee Boon	25	M	Singapore	19 April 1996	Drug Trafficking	34g of heroin	Ong Teng Cheong
235	Lee Meng Hong	36	M	Singapore	19 April 1996	Drug Trafficking	75g of heroin	Ong Teng Cheong
236	John Martin Scripps	36	M	United Kingdom	19 April 1996	Multiple Murders	Gerard Lowe, Sheila Mae Damude, and Darin Jon Damude	Ong Teng Cheong
237	Abdul Karim Mohammad	24	M	Singapore	26 April 1996	Drug Trafficking	108g of heroin	Ong Teng Cheong
238	Wong Yoke Wah	35	M	Malaysia	26 April 1996	Drug Trafficking	1.8 kg of heroin	Ong Teng Cheong
239	Loo Koon Seng	34	M	Singapore	24 May 1996	Drug Trafficking	55g of heroin	Ong Teng Cheong
240	Toh Chwe Chuan	54	M	Singapore	24 May 1996	Drug Trafficking	905g of heroin	Ong Teng Cheong
241	Tan Jin Chiang	54	M	Singapore	24 May 1996	Drug Trafficking	905g of heroin	Ong Teng Cheong
242	Roslan Mohammed Sany	29	M	Singapore	26 July 1996	Drug Trafficking	19g of heroin	Ong Teng Cheong
243	Too Chai Kim	39	M	Malaysia	26 July 1996	Drug Trafficking	800g of heroin	Ong Teng Cheong
244	Lau Mui Hai	26	M	Singapore	26 July 1996	Drug Trafficking	50g of heroin	Ong Teng Cheong
245	Rosli Shamsuri	33	M	Singapore	26 July 1996	Drug Trafficking	330g of heroin	Ong Teng Cheong
246	Zainal Abidin Abdul Malik	29	M	Singapore	30 August 1996	Murder	Boo Tiang Huat	Ong Teng Cheong
247	Teo Kim Hong	36	F	Singapore	30 August 1996	Murder	Ching Bee Ing	Ong Teng Cheong
248	Thongbai Naklangdon	28	M	Thailand	30 August 1996	Murder	Suk Malasri	Ong Teng Cheong
249	Jeerasak Densakul	24	M	Thailand	30 August 1996	Drug Trafficking	2 kg of cannabis	Ong Teng Cheong
250	Chua Hock Cheong	37	M	Singapore	20 September 1996	Drug Trafficking	78g of heroin	Ong Teng Cheong
251	Muhamad Hazani	24	M	Malaysia	20 September 1996	Drug Trafficking	1.9 kg of cannabis	Ong Teng Cheong
252	Zulkifli Awang Kachik	36	M	Malaysia	20 September 1996	Drug Trafficking	1.8 kg of cannabis	Ong Teng Cheong
253	Pauzi Ab Kadir	30	M	Malaysia	20 September 1996	Drug Trafficking	1.8 kg of cannabis	Ong Teng Cheong
254	Tan Seng Kim	43	M	Singapore	27 September 1996	Drug Trafficking	871 grams of heroin	Ong Teng Cheong
255	Goh Joon Tong	47	M	Singapore	27 September 1996	Drug Trafficking	871 grams of heroin	Ong Teng Cheong
256	Koland Ko Choon Kwang	41	M	Singapore	27 September 1996	Drug Trafficking	871 grams of heroin	Ong Teng Cheong
257	Pracha Thanomnin	30	M	Thailand	10 January 1997	Murder	Lee Kok Yin	Ong Teng Cheong
258	Cheng Tim Fook	46	M	Singapore	25 April 1997	Drug Trafficking	679g of heroin	Ong Teng Cheong
259	Teh Thiam Huat	36	M	Singapore	25 April 1997	Drug Trafficking	33g of heroin	Ong Teng Cheong
260	Chua Kiat Ann	38	M	Singapore	25 April 1997	Drug Trafficking	491g of heroin	Ong Teng Cheong
261	Khampun Sriyotha	34	M	Thailand	4 July 1997	Murder	Somwang Yapapha	Ong Teng Cheong
262	Samlee Prathumtree	47	M	Thailand	4 July 1997	Murder	Somwang Yapapha	Ong Teng Cheong
263	Abdul Rahman Yusof	39	M	Singapore	4 July 1997	Drug Trafficking	590g of cannabis	Ong Teng Cheong
264	La Abuhari La Odd Hamid	29	M	Singapore	4 July 1997	Drug Trafficking	590g of cannabis	Ong Teng Cheong
265	Low Theng Gee	32	M	Singapore	4 July 1997	Drug Trafficking	31g of diamorphine	Ong Teng Cheong
266	Lim Chwee Soon	30	M	Singapore	25 July 1997	Armed Robbery	How Sau Che	Ong Teng Cheong
267	Chan Ah Kow	27	M	Singapore	3 October 1997	Drug Trafficking	50g of heroin	Ong Teng Cheong
268	Jimmy Chua Hwa Soon	27	M	Singapore	February 1998 (Note: The exact date of Soon's execution date is unknown, but he lost his final appeal on February, and was most likely hanged shortly after.)	Murder	Neo Lam Lye	Ong Teng Cheong
269	Tan Chuan Ten	36	M	Singapore	24 April 1998	Drug Trafficking	67g of heroin	Ong Teng Cheong
270	Lau Boon Huat	47	M	Singapore	24 April 1998	Drug Trafficking	454g of heroin	Ong Teng Cheong
271	Lim Seng Yong	33	M	Singapore	24 April 1998	Drug Trafficking	111g of heroin	Ong Teng Cheong
272	Asogan Ramesh Ramachandren	24	M	Singapore	29 May 1998	Murder	Saravanan Michael Ramalingam	Ong Teng Cheong
273	Selvar Kumar Silvaras	25	M	Singapore	29 May 1998	Murder	Saravanan Michael Ramalingam	Ong Teng Cheong
274	Tan Chuan Chyang	36	M	Singapore	29 May 1998	Drug Trafficking	83g of heroin	Ong Teng Cheong
275	Sim Eng Teck	21	M	Singapore	August 1998 (Note: The exact date of Teeck's execution date is unknown, but he lost his final appeal on August, and was most likely hanged shortly after.)	Murder	Benny Probocemdana Oen	Ong Teng Cheong
276	Lim Chin Chong	20	M	Malaysia	23 October 1998	Murder	Low Cheng Quee	Ong Teng Cheong
277	Bryan Yeo Sin Rung	26	M	Singapore	15 January 1999	Drug Trafficking	2kg of heroin	Ong Teng Cheong
278	Kelvin Chai Chien Wei	23	M	Singapore	15 January 1999	Drug Trafficking	2kg of heroin	Ong Teng Cheong
279	Jonaris Badlishah	24	M	Malaysia	24 February 1999	Robbery and Murder	Sally Poh Bee Eng	Ong Teng Cheong
280	Gerardine Andrew	36	F	Singapore	26 February 1999	Murder	Sivapackiam Veerappan Rengasamy	Ong Teng Cheong
281	Mansoor Abdullah	23	M	Singapore	26 February 1999	Murder	Sivapackiam Veerappan Rengasamy	Ong Teng Cheong
282	Nazar Mohamed Kassim	28	M	Singapore	26 February 1999	Murder	Sivapackiam Veerappan Rengasamy	Ong Teng Cheong
283	Sim Cheng Hui	40	M	Singapore	5 March 1999	Drug Trafficking	500g of heroin	Ong Teng Cheong
284	Teo Lam Choon	51	M	Singapore	5 March 1999	Drug Trafficking	500g of heroin	Ong Teng Cheong
285	Teo Seng Peng	25	M	Singapore	5 March 1999	Drug Trafficking	500g of heroin	Ong Teng Cheong
286	Too Yin Sheong	27	M	Singapore	30 April 1999	Murder	Lee Kok Cheong	Ong Teng Cheong
287	Su Chee Kiong	35	M	Singapore	11 June 1999	Drug Trafficking	81g of heroin	Ong Teng Cheong
288	Cheong Chuan Peng	36	M	Singapore	25 June 1999	Drug Trafficking	43g of heroin	Ong Teng Cheong
289	Chua Gin Boon	34	M	Singapore	25 June 1999	Drug Trafficking	60g of heroin	Ong Teng Cheong
290	Shaiful Edham bin Adam	23	M	Singapore	2 July 1999	Murder	Iordanka Apostolova	Ong Teng Cheong
291	Norishyam s/o Mohamed Ali	27	M	Singapore	2 July 1999	Murder	Iordanka Apostolova	Ong Teng Cheong
292	S. Nagarajan Kuppusamy	39	M	Singapore	23 July 1999	Murder	Jaranjeet Singh	Ong Teng Cheong
293	Imran Adam	27	M	Singapore	29 October 1999	Drug Trafficking	82g of heroin	S. R. Nathan
294	Lim Tiong Lee	30	M	Singapore	29 October 1999	Drug Trafficking	301g of heroin	S. R. Nathan
295	Satli bin Masot	25	M	Singapore	29 October 1999	Drug Trafficking	148g of heroin	S. R. Nathan
296	Lai Chaw Won	23	M	Malaysia	17 December 1999	Drug Trafficking	125g of heroin	S. R. Nathan
297	Goh Choon Meng	25	M	Malaysia	17 December 1999	Drug Trafficking	168g of heroin	S. R. Nathan
298	Chan Choon Wai	20	M	Malaysia	May 2000 (Note: The exact date of Wai's execution date is unknown, but he lost his final appeal on May, and was most likely hanged shortly after.)	Murder	Koh Mew Chin	S. R. Nathan
299	Sow Siow Yin	33	F	Singapore	28 July 2000	Drug Trafficking	140g of heroin	S. R. Nathan
300	Tan Chwee Heng	39	M	Singapore	28 July 2000	Drug Trafficking	140g of heroin	S. R. Nathan
301	Lau Lee Peng	48	M	Singapore	1 September 2000	Robbery and Murder	Lily Tan Eng Yan	S. R. Nathan
302	Chan Chim Yee	43	M	Singapore	15 September 2000	Murder	Ooi Ang Yen	S. R. Nathan
303	Julaiha Begum	51	F	Singapore	16 February 2001	Murder	T. Maniam	S. R. Nathan
304	Loganatha Venkatesan	25	M	Singapore	16 February 2001	Murder	T. Maniam	S. R. Nathan
305	Chandran Rajagopal	26	M	Singapore	16 February 2001	Murder	T. Maniam	S. R. Nathan
306	Jimmy Goh Chye Soon	27	M	Singapore	26 October 2001	Drug Trafficking	82g of heroin	S. R. Nathan
307	Tay Chin Wah	68	M	Singapore	26 October 2001	Discharge of a Firearm	Lee Yang Ping	S. R. Nathan
308	Seah Kok Meng	32	M	Singapore	30 November 2001	Murder	S. Salim Ahmad	S. R. Nathan
309	Khwan-On Natthaphon	28	M	Thailand	27 September 2002	Murder	Ong Huay Dee	S. R. Nathan
310	Rosli bin Ahmat	33	M	Singapore	25 October 2002	Robbery and Murder	Koh Ngiap Yong and Jahabar Sathick	S. R. Nathan
311	Wan Kamil bin Mohamed Shafian	36	M	Singapore	25 October 2002	Robbery and Murder	Koh Ngiap Yong and Jahabar Sathick	S. R. Nathan
312	Ibrahim bin Mohamed	37	M	Singapore	25 October 2002	Robbery and Murder	Koh Ngiap Yong and Jahabar Sathick	S. R. Nathan
313	Anthony Ler Wee Teang	35	M	Singapore	13 December 2002	Murder	Annie Leong Wai Mun	S. R. Nathan
314	Kanesan Ratnam	37	M	Singapore	10 January 2003	Murder	Shankar Suppiahmaniam	S. R. Nathan
315	Dornchinnamat Yingyos	20	M	Thailand	21 February 2003	Murder	Saenphan Thawan	S. R. Nathan
316	Thongthot Yordsa-Art	34	M	Thailand	21 February 2003	Murder	Saenphan Thawan	S. R. Nathan
317	Seethong Phichet	39	M	Thailand	21 February 2003	Murder	Saenphan Thawan	S. R. Nathan
318	Mohamed Isnin Saleh	28	M	Singapore	20 June 2003	Drug Trafficking	34.8 kg of heroin	S. R. Nathan
319	Azman Ismail	24	M	Singapore	20 June 2003	Drug Trafficking	34.8 kg of heroin	S. R. Nathan
320	Ruzaini Ajis	33	M	Singapore	20 June 2003	Drug Trafficking	34.8 kg of heroin	S. R. Nathan
321	Vignes Mourthi	23	M	Malaysia	26 September 2003	Drug Trafficking	27.65g of diamorphine	S. R. Nathan
322	Moorthy Angappan	26	M	Malaysia	26 September 2003	Drug Trafficking	27.65g of diamorphine	S. R. Nathan
323	Arun Prakash Vaithilingam	25	M	India	3 October 2003	Murder	Lourdusamy Lenin Selvanayagan	S. R. Nathan
324	Jin Yugang	37	M	China	19 March 2004	Murder	Wang Hong	S. R. Nathan
325	Yen May Woen	37	F	Singapore	19 March 2004	Drug Trafficking	30 grams of heroin	S. R. Nathan
326	Soosainathan Dass Saminathan	42	M	Singapore	21 May 2004	Rape and Murder	Anjeli Elisaputri	S. R. Nathan
327	Tan Chee Wee	30	M	Malaysia	11 June 2004	Rape and Murder	Thabun Pranee	S. R. Nathan
328	Raman Selvam Renganathan	28	M	Singapore	16 July 2004	Drug Trafficking	2.7 kg of cannabis	S. R. Nathan
329	Harith Gary Lee	40	M	Singapore	22 April 2005	Murder	Diana Teo Siew Peng	S. R. Nathan
330	Shanmugam Murugesu	38	M	Singapore	13 May 2005	Drug Trafficking	1 kg of cannabis	S. R. Nathan
331	Lim Thian Lai	49	M	Singapore	September 2005 (Note: The exact date of Lai's execution date is unknown, but he lost his final appeal on September, and was most likely hanged shortly after.)	Murder	Tan Tiong Huat	S. R. Nathan
332	Zailani bin Ahmad	36	M	Singapore	?? 2005 (Note: The exact date of Ahmad's execution date is unknown, but he lost his final appeal on November 2004, and was most likely hanged sometime next year.)	Murder	Chi Tue Tiong	S. R. Nathan
333	Nguyen Tuong-van	25	M	Australia	2 December 2005	Drug Trafficking	396.2 grams of diamorphine	S. R. Nathan
334	Lim Poh Lye	46	M	Singapore	28 April 2006	Robbery and Murder	Bock Tuan Thong	S. R. Nathan
335	Tony Koh Zhan Quan	39	M	Singapore	28 April 2006	Robbery and Murder	Bock Tuan Thong	S. R. Nathan
336	Mohd Halmi bin Hamid	28	M	Malaysia	23 June 2006	Drug Trafficking	75.56g of heroin	S. R. Nathan
337	Mohamad Bin Ahmad	26	M	Malaysia	23 June 2006	Drug Trafficking	75.56g of heroin	S. R. Nathan
338	Took Leng How	24	M	Malaysia	3 November 2006	Kidnapping and Murder	Huang Na	S. R. Nathan
339	Iwuchukwu Amara Tochi	21	M	Nigeria	26 January 2007	Drug Trafficking	727.02 grams of diamorphine	S. R. Nathan
340	Okele Nelson Malachy	19	M	Stateless	26 January 2007	Drug Trafficking	727.02 grams of diamorphine	S. R. Nathan
341	Leong Siew Chor	52	M	Singapore	30 November 2007	Murder	Liu Hong Mei	S. R. Nathan
342	Abdul Malik bin Usman	27	M	Malaysia	February 2008 (Note: The exact date of Usman's, Kupli's and Hasim's execution date is unknown, but they lost their final appeals on February 2008, and were most likely hanged shortly after.)	Murder	Thein Naing	S. R. Nathan
343	Kamal bin Kupli	23	M	Malaysia	February 2008	Murder	Thein Naing	S. R. Nathan
344	Hamir bin Hasim	22	M	Malaysia	February 2008	Murder	Thein Naing	S. R. Nathan
345	Mohammed Ali bin Johari	32	M	Singapore	19 December 2008	Rape and Murder	Nurasyura binte Mohamed Fauzi	S. R. Nathan
346	Tan Chor Jin	42	M	Singapore	9 January 2009	Discharge of a Firearm	Lim Hock Soon	S. R. Nathan
347	Tharema Vejayan Govindasamy	40	M	Singapore	?? 2011 (Note: The exact date of Govindasamy's execution date is unknown, but he lost his final appeal on September 2010, and was most likely hanged sometime next year.)	Murder	Smaelmeeral Abdul Aziz	S. R. Nathan
348	Nakamuthu Balakrishnan	39	M	Singapore	8 July 2011	Robbery and Murder	Wan Cheon Kem	S. R. Nathan
349	Tang Hai Liang	36	M	Singapore	18 July 2014	Drug Trafficking	89.55g of diamorphine	Tony Tan
350	Foong Chee Peng	48	M	Singapore	18 July 2014	Drug Trafficking	40.23g of diamorphine	Tony Tan
351	Muhammad Kadar	39	M	Singapore	17 April 2015	Murder	Tham Weng Kuen	Tony Tan
352	Wang Zhijian	50	M	China	20 May 2016	Multiple Murders (Yishun triple murders)	Zhang Meng, Feng Jianyu, and Yang Jie	Tony Tan
353	Kho Jabing	32	M	Malaysia	20 May 2016	Robbery and Murder	Cao Ruyin	Tony Tan
354	Chijioke Stephen Obioha	38	M	Nigeria	18 November 2016	Drug Trafficking	2604.56g of cannabis	Tony Tan
355	Devendran a/l Supramaniam	31	M	Malaysia	18 November 2016	Drug Trafficking	83.36g of diamorphine	Tony Tan
356	Jeffrey Marquez Abineno (Note: Sentenced to death under his birth name Mohd Jeefrey bin Jamil.)	52	M	Malaysia	21 April 2017	Drug Trafficking	45.26g of diamorphine	Tony Tan
357	Muhamad Ridzuan Mohd Ali	31	M	Singapore	19 May 2017	Drug Trafficking	72.50g of pure heroin	Tony Tan
358	Prabagaran a/l Srivijayan	29	M	Malaysia	14 July 2017	Drug Trafficking	22.24g of diamorphine	Tony Tan
359	Rasheed Muhammad	46	M	Pakistan	?? 2018 (Note: The exact date of Muhammad and Rizwan's execution date is unknown, but they lost their final appeals on September 2017, and were most likely hanged sometime next year.)	Murder	Muhammad Noor	Halimah Yacob
360	Ramzan Rizwan	28	M	Pakistan	?? 2018	Murder	Muhammad Noor	Halimah Yacob
361	Billy Agbozo	39	M	Ghana	12 March 2018	Drug Trafficking	1.63kg of methamphetamine	Halimah Yacob
362	Hishamrudin bin Mohd	59	M	Singapore	16 March 2018	Drug Trafficking	34.94g of diamorphine	Halimah Yacob
363	Zainudin bin Mohamed	44	M	Singapore	5 October 2018	Drug Trafficking	22.73g of diamorphine	Halimah Yacob
364	Abdul Wahid Bin Ismail	59	M	Singapore	5 October 2018	Drug Trafficking	46.64g of diamorphine	Halimah Yacob
365	Mohsen Bin Na’im	42	M	Singapore	5 October 2018	Drug Trafficking	44.75g of diamorphine	Halimah Yacob
366	Selamat bin Paki	56	M	Singapore	24 October 2018	Drug Trafficking	27.12g of diamorphine	Halimah Yacob
367	Ali Bin Mohammad Bahashwan	69	M	Singapore	24 October 2018	Drug Trafficking	27.12g of diamorphine	Halimah Yacob
368	Prabu Pranthaman	31	M	Malaysia	26 October 2018	Drug Trafficking	227.82g of diamorphine	Halimah Yacob
369	Irwan bin Ali	43	M	Singapore	26 October 2018	Drug Trafficking	2.5kg of heroin	Halimah Yacob
370	Micheal Anak Garing	30	M	Malaysia	22 March 2019	Robbery and Murder	Shanmuganathan Dillidurai	Halimah Yacob
371	Abd Helmi bin Ab Halim	36	M	Malaysia	22 November 2019	Drug Trafficking	16.56g of diamorphine	Halimah Yacob
372	Abdul Kahar Othman	68	M	Singapore	30 March 2022	Drug Trafficking	66.77g of diamorphine	Halimah Yacob
373	Nagaenthran K. Dharmalingam	33	M	Malaysia	27 April 2022	Drug Trafficking	42.72g of heroin	Halimah Yacob
374	Kalwant Singh Jogindar Singh	31	M	Malaysia	7 July 2022	Drug Trafficking	120.90g of diamorphine	Halimah Yacob
375	Norasharee Gous	48	M	Singapore	7 July 2022	Drug Trafficking	120.90g of diamorphine	Halimah Yacob
376	Nazeri Lajim	64	M	Singapore	22 July 2022	Drug Trafficking	960g of heroin	Halimah Yacob
377	Abdul Rahim Shapiee	44	M	Singapore	5 August 2022	Drug Trafficking	41.24g of heroin	Halimah Yacob
378	Ong Seow Ping	49	M	Singapore	5 August 2022	Drug Trafficking	41.24g of heroin	Halimah Yacob
379	Tangaraju Suppiah	46	M	Singapore	26 April 2023	Drug Trafficking	1 kg of marijuana	Halimah Yacob
380	Muhammad Faizal Bin Mohd Shariff	36	M	Singapore	17 May 2023	Drug Trafficking	1.56 kg of marijuana	Halimah Yacob
381	Mohd Aziz bin Hussain	56	M	Singapore	26 July 2023	Drug Trafficking	49.98g of diamorphine	Halimah Yacob
382	Saridewi Djamani	45	F	Singapore	28 July 2023	Drug Trafficking	30.72g of diamorphine	Halimah Yacob
383	Mohamed Shalleh Abdul Latiff	39	M	Singapore	3 August 2023	Drug Trafficking	54.04g of diamorphine	Halimah Yacob
384	Ahmed Salim	35	M	Bangladesh	28 February 2024	Murder	Nurhidayati Wartono Surata	Tharman Shanmugaratnam
385	Moad Fadzir bin Mustaffa	45	M	Singapore	2 August 2024	Drug Trafficking	36.93g of diamorphine	Tharman Shanmugaratnam
386	A. Steven Paul Raj	59	M	Singapore	7 August 2024	Drug Trafficking	35.85g of diamorphine	Tharman Shanmugaratnam
387	Mohammad Azwan bin Bohari	48	M	Singapore	4 October 2024	Drug Trafficking	26.5g of diamorphine	Tharman Shanmugaratnam
388	Sulaiman Jumari	64	M	Singapore	16 October 2024	Drug Trafficking	52.75g of diamorphine	Tharman Shanmugaratnam
389	Roslan Bakar	53	M	Singapore	15 November 2024	Drug Trafficking	96.07g of diamorphine	Tharman Shanmugaratnam
390	Pausi Jefridin	39	M	Singapore	15 November 2024	Drug Trafficking	96.07g of diamorphine	Tharman Shanmugaratnam
391	Rosman Abdullah	55	M	Singapore	22 November 2024	Drug Trafficking	57.43g of diamorphine	Tharman Shanmugaratnam
392	Masoud Rahimi bin Mehrzad	35	M	Singapore	29 November 2024	Drug Trafficking	31.14g of diamorphine	Tharman Shanmugaratnam
393	Syed Suhail Syed Zin	48	M	Singapore	23 January 2025	Drug Trafficking	38.84g of diamorphine	Tharman Shanmugaratnam
394	Iskandar bin Rahmat	46	M	Singapore	5 February 2025	Murder	Tan Boon Sin and Tan Chee Heong	Tharman Shanmugaratnam
395	Mohammad Reduan Mustaffar	41	M	Singapore	9 April 2025	Drug Trafficking	661.2g of methamphetamine	Tharman Shanmugaratnam
396	Roshdi Abdullah Altway	65	M	Singapore	10 April 2025	Drug Trafficking	78.77g of diamorphine	Tharman Shanmugaratnam
397	Teo Ghim Heng	49	M	Singapore	16 April 2025	Murder	Choong Pei Shan and Teo Zi Ning	Tharman Shanmugaratnam
398	Muhammad Salleh bin Hamid	37	M	Singapore	23 May 2025	Drug Trafficking	325.81g of methamphetamine	Tharman Shanmugaratnam
399	Chandroo Subramaniam	56	M	Malaysia	25 July 2025	Drug Trafficking	1344.5g of cannabis	Tharman Shanmugaratnam
400	Kishor Kumar A/L Raguan	44	M	Malaysia	30 July 2025	Drug Trafficking	36.05g of diamorphine	Tharman Shanmugaratnam
401	Datchinamurthy Kataiah	39	M	Malaysia	25 September 2025	Drug Trafficking	45g of heroin	Tharman Shanmugaratnam
402	Pannir Selvam Pranthaman	38	M	Malaysia	8 October 2025	Drug Trafficking	15g of heroin	Tharman Shanmugaratnam
403	Hamzah Bin Ibrahim	64	M	Singapore	15 October 2025	Drug Trafficking	26.29g of heroin	Tharman Shanmugaratnam
404	Tika Pesik	50	F	Singapore	15 October 2025	Drug Trafficking	26.29g of heroin	Tharman Shanmugaratnam
405	Tan Kay Yong	49	M	Singapore	26 November 2025	Drug Trafficking	18.71g of diamorphine	Tharman Shanmugaratnam
406	Mohammad Rizwan bin Akbar Husain	44	M	Singapore	27 November 2025	Drug Trafficking	301.6g of heroin	Tharman Shanmugaratnam
407	Saminathan Selvaraju	42	M	Malaysia	27 November 2025	Drug Trafficking	301.6g of heroin	Tharman Shanmugaratnam
408	Ramdhan bin Lajis	62	M	Singapore	9 January 2026	Drug Trafficking	29.51g of diamorphine	Tharman Shanmugaratnam
409	Steve Crocker	54	M	Singapore	9 January 2026	Drug Trafficking	29.51g of diamorphine	Tharman Shanmugaratnam
410	Jumaat bin Mohamed Sayed	56	M	Singapore	22 January 2026	Drug Trafficking	147.98g of diamorphine	Tharman Shanmugaratnam
411	Lingkesvaran Rajendaren	33	M	Malaysia	11 February 2026	Drug Trafficking	52.77g of diamorphine	Tharman Shanmugaratnam
412	Mohd Akebal s/o Ghulam Jilani	62	M	Singapore	13 February 2026	Drug Trafficking	29.06g of diamorphine	Tharman Shanmugaratnam
413	Jumadi Bin Abdullah	52	M	Singapore	2 April 2026	Drug Trafficking	42.27g of diamorphine	Tharman Shanmugaratnam
414	Shisham Bin Abdul Rahman	53	M	Singapore	2 April 2026	Drug Trafficking	42.27g of diamorphine	Tharman Shanmugaratnam
415	Omar bin Yacob Bamadhaj	54	M	Singapore	16 April 2026	Drug Trafficking	1009g of cannabis	Tharman Shanmugaratnam
416	Chong Hoon Cheong	65	M	Singapore	29 April 2026	Drug Trafficking	25.01g of heroin	Tharman Shanmugaratnam
417	Gunalan Goval	47	M	Malaysia	15 May 2026	Drug Trafficking	1276.6g of cannabis	Tharman Shanmugaratnam
418	Eddie Lee Zheng Da	32	M	Singapore	21 May 2026	Drug Trafficking	24.21g of diamorphine	Tharman Shanmugaratnam
419	Mohamed Ansari bin Mohamed Abdul Aziz	53	M	Singapore	22 May 2026	Drug Trafficking	39.68g of diamorphine	Tharman Shanmugaratnam
420	Munusamy Ramarmurth	44	M	Malaysia	3 July 2026	Drug Trafficking	57.54g of diamorphine	Tharman Shanmugaratnam
421	Shen Hanjie	35	M	Singapore	23 July 2026	Drug Trafficking	34.9g of diamorphine	Tharman Shanmugaratnam
422	Teo Yiu Kin Tee	79	M	Stateless	7 August 2026	Drug Trafficking	24.81g of diamorphine	Tharman Shanmugaratnam
423	Amos Tan Yew Kuan	68	M	Singapore	21 August 2026	Drug Trafficking	37.95g of diamorphine	Tharman Shanmugaratnam
424	Dineshkumar Sambusivam	34	M	Malaysia	21 August 2026	Drug Trafficking	37.95g of diamorphine	Tharman Shanmugaratnam
425	Sanjay Matthias Krishnan	44	M	Singapore	9 September 2026	Drug Trafficking	2,375.1g of cannabis	Tharman Shanmugaratnam

== Demographics since 1965 ==
From analysis of publicly available data, the vast majority of executions took place during President Ong Teng Cheong's administration in the 1990's and were for young adult male Singaporean nationals who were convicted of drug trafficking.

Nationality
Singapore	272	64%
Malaysia	88	21%
Thailand	22	5%
British Hong Kong	16	4%
Nigeria	9	2%
India	5	1%
Bangladesh	3	<1%
Ghana	3	<1%
Indonesia	3	<1%
China	2	<1%
Pakistan	2	<1%
Stateless	2	<1%
Australia	1	<1%
Portuguese Macau	1	<1%
Netherlands	1	<1%
Philippines	1	<1%
United Kingdom	1	<1%
Age
10–19	1	<1%
20–29	182	43%
30–39	135	32%
40–49	62	15%
50–59	33	8%
60–69	11	3%
70–79	1	<1%
Sex
Male	409	96%
Female	17	4%
Crime
Drug Trafficking	230	54%
Murder	176	41%
Discharge of a Firearm	9	2%
Armed Robbery	3	<1%
Date of execution
1960–1969	21	5%
1970–1979	38	9%
1980–1989	41	10%
1990–1999	204	48%
2000–2009	48	11%
2010–2019	24	6%
2020–2029	53	12%
Method
Hanging	425	100%
President (Party)
Yusof Ishak (I)	23	5%
Benjamin Sheares (I)	43	10%
Yeoh Ghim Seng (Note: Yeoh Ghim Seng was Singapore's acting President after Benjamin Sheare's death in 1981, and before Devan Nair won the 1980 Singaporean general election) (I)	3	1%
Devan Nair (I)	11	3%
Wee Kim Wee (I)	40	9%
Ong Teng Cheong (I)	173	41%
S.R Nathan (I)	56	13%
Tony Tan (I)	10	2%
Halimah Yacob (I)	25	6%
Tharman Shanmugaratnam (I)	48	11%
Total	425	100%

== See also ==
- Crime in Singapore
- Law of Singapore
- Life imprisonment in Singapore
- Capital punishment in Singapore
- List of major crimes in Singapore
