= Murder of Madikum Puspanathan =

1976 fatal stabbing of a man at Jalan Besar, Singapore

Madikum Puspanathan
- Born: Madikum Puspanathan c. 1930; Singapore, Straits Settlements, British Malaya
- Died: 23 January 1976 (aged 46); Jalan Besar, Singapore
- Cause of death: Fatal knife wound to the heart
- Other name: M. Puspanathan
- Occupation: Sweeper
- Known for: Murder victim
- Spouse: Unnamed wife
- Children: 2

On 23 January 1976, while inside a bar at Jalan Besar, two patrons - Madikum Puspanathan and Visuvanathan Thillai Kannu - had a dispute with each other that resulted in Visuvanathan stabbing Madikum to death with a knife. Visuvanathan fled to Malaysia but he was eventually arrested two months after the stabbing and charged with murder after his extradition to Singapore. Although the defence sought to prove that Visuvanathan never meant to stab Madikum to death and he was drunk at the time of the crime, Visuvanathan was nonetheless found guilty of murdering Madikum and sentenced to death, after the trial court found that Visuvanathan had intentionally stabbed the victim and such that the injury inflicted was sufficient in the ordinary course of nature to cause death. In the aftermath, Visuvanathan's appeal was dismissed, and he was hanged on 25 May 1979.

== Stabbing and death of Madikum ==
On the night of 23 January 1976, a man was attacked and stabbed to death outside a pub at Jalan Besar. The deceased, identified as 46-year-old Madikum Puspanathan, was a road sweeper who was a familiar figure often seen in the area, sweeping the road for a living. Madikum left behind a wife and two children at the time of his death, and according to first-hand witness accounts, Madikum, who was at the pub having drinks with his friends, was attacked by at least two to three assailants, and was stabbed several times before the attacker(s) escaped. Dr Seah Han Cheow, a forensic pathologist, later conducted an autopsy on the victim. He found there were at least three stab wounds on Madikum's neck and chest, and one of the stab wounds had penetrated Madikum's heart, and it was sufficient in the ordinary course of nature to cause Madikum's death.

== Arrest of suspect ==
After two months of police investigation, it was eventually pieced together that a lone attacker was responsible for the murder of Madikum Puspanathan back in January 1976, and the suspected killer's identity was also established by the police. On 4 March 1976, it was reported that the suspect, 23-year-old Malaysian citizen Visuvanathan Thillai Kannu, was wanted by the police for murdering Madikum, and the Singaporean police also sought his assistance in investigations of the case.

During that same month, on 28 March 1976, the Royal Malaysia Police arrested Visuvanathan in his hometown of Batu Pahat, which was located in Kluang, Johor. Visuvanathan was extradited back to Singapore a few days after his arrest, and he was therefore charged with murder.

== Trial of Visuvanathan ==
Visuvanathan Thillai Kannu
- Born: Visuvanathan s/o Thillai Kannu c. 1952; Batu Pahat, Kluang, Johor, Malaysia
- Died: 25 May 1979 (aged 27); Changi Prison, Singapore
- Cause of death: Execution by hanging
- Occupation: Labourer
- Status: Executed
- Motive: Anger over an alleged staring incident
- Conviction: Murder (one count)
- Criminal charges: 1st charge: Murder of Madikum Puspanathan
- Penalty: Death by hanging

On 18 November 1976, eight months after he was arrested, 24-year-old Visuvanathan Thillai Kannu stood trial at the High Court for murdering Madikum Puspanathan, and he was represented by state-assigned defence counsel Bevin Netto and Peter Pang, while the prosecution was led by Deputy Public Prosecutor Sant Singh. The trial was presided by two judges - Justice A P Rajah and Justice Choor Singh - of the High Court.

The trial court was told that on the night of 23 January 1976, Madikum was drinking at the pub with his friends when Visuvanathan, who was also a patron of the pub and drinking at another table with his friends, allegedly noticed Madikum was staring at him while he was drinking, which incensed him and led to him confronting Madikum. Madikum denied that he was staring at Visuvanathan, and he also ignored Visuvanathan's boast that he was the leader of a gang operating from Veerasamy Road. After this, Visuvanathan left the bar and went to his aunt's house to grab a knife, and he returned to the bar, where he asked for a treat before he challenged Madikum to a fight. Afterwards, Visuvanathan used the knife to stab Madikum before he fled into a backlane at Upper Weld Road, leaving Madikum to die from his wounds. 27-year-old Loganathan Pakrisamy, one of Madikum's friends present at the bar, testified that he witnessed Visuvanathan stabbing Madikum to death, but he denied the defence's contention that he and Madikum first confronted Visuvanathan or challenged Visuvanthan to fight.

In his defence, Visuvanathan denied that he had murdered Madikum. He claimed that on that night itself, it was Madikum and Loganathan who both challenged Visuvanathan to a fight, and he therefore left the bar out of fear for his life, and he retrieved the knife from his aunt's place and returned to the bar, as he wanted to use the knife for self-protection and out of fear that Madikum and Loganathan was armed. Visuvanathan claimed that he did not intend to cause Madikum's death when he stabbed him, and stated he was drunk at the time of the stabbing and therefore was not fully aware of what he was doing. Visuvanathan also claimed that his statements were made involuntarily and he was forced to confess due to the investigating officer Cheok Koon Seng threatening him, but his statements was ruled admissible by the court and his claims of confessing under duress were dismissed.

On 26 November 1976, after a trial lasting seven days, Justice A P Rajah and Justice Choor Singh delivered their judgement, with Justice Singh pronouncing the decision in court. Justice Singh stated that both judges carefully scrutinized the submissions of both the defence and prosecution, and they determined that Visuvanathan's defence of alcohol intoxication was ought to be rejected, since Visuvanathan did not suffer from impaired mental responsibility as induced by the effects of alcohol intake, and he was fully conscious of his actions at the time of the stabbing. They also accepted the eyewitness testimonies, and found that Visuvanathan had intentionally stabbed Madikum on the chest, such that the knife had penetrated Madikum's heart and hence the injury caused was sufficient in the ordinary course of nature to cause death, and there was no possibility of accidental stabbing or the injury being unintended. Therefore, the judges ruled that there were sufficient grounds to return with a verdict of murder in Visuvanathan's case.

As a result, 24-year-old Visuvanathan Thillai Kannu was found guilty of murder, and sentenced to death. The death penalty was mandated as the sole punishment permitted for murder upon an offender's conviction under Singaporean law.

== Execution ==
On 1 December 1976, four days after he was sentenced to hang, Visuvanathan filed his notice of appeal to the High Court against his conviction and sentence, and the appeal was subsequently heard by the Court of Appeal. On 16 January 1978, the appellate court's three judges - Chief Justice Wee Chong Jin, Justice Frederick Arthur Chua (F A Chua) and Justice T Kulasekaram - rejected Visuvanathan's appeal without calling for the reply of Lawrence Ang, who led the prosecution during the appeal hearing. Briefly delivering their oral grounds of decision, the three judges found that there was no merit in Visuvanathan's appeal and they therefore upheld the trial court's decision to convict Visuvanathan of murder, since the evidence had satisfactorily proven Visuvanathan's guilt beyond a reasonable doubt.

On 25 May 1979, after he ate his last breakfast, 27-year-old Visuvanathan Thillai Kannu was hanged in Changi Prison at dawn. Visuvanathan was the fourth person to be put to death during that year itself. Two weeks before Visuvanathan's execution, three men - Lee Keng Guan, Wong Loke Fatt and Ho Joo Huat - were executed for a firearm robbery committed in Katong five years prior.

== Aftermath ==
In the aftermath of his execution, Visuvanathan's case became a notable legal case study in relation to the charge of murder under Section 300(c) of the Penal Code, and the exact nature of the murder concerned in Visuvanathan's case came under this particular section.

Original text of Section 300(c) (Extracted from the Penal Code):

(c): if it is done with the intention of causing bodily injury to any person, and the bodily injury intended to be inflicted is sufficient in the ordinary course of nature to cause death

The case itself touched on the definition of Section 300(c), which highlighted the difficulty and dilemma of convicting a person of murder by having voluntarily inflicted a fatal injury without having the intention to cause death, and it also contributed to shaping the courts' approach to find a person guilty of murder under Section 300(c), which mainly focused on firstly, whether the intention to inflict the injury was present or not, and if the injury caused was sufficient to cause death in the ordinary course of nature. The case itself also scrutinized the Privy Council decision of Mohamed Yasin bin Hussin's case, in which Yasin was found not guilty of murdering an elderly woman due to the prosecution failing to prove if he had the intention to cause the fatal rib fractures per Section 300(c).

With reference to Yasin's case, the trial judges determined in their verdict that while the case of Yasin was in alignment with Section 300(c)'s definition, the proposed subjective approach in the case only concerned if the person specifically had the intent to cause an injury, while the fatality of the injury caused was not a subjective one, and hence the guiding principles of Yasin's case was rendered universally not applicable for all cases, and the approach in Visuvanathan's case was considered to be a more stricter one that disregarded the question of whether the fatal injury(s) was accidentally or intentionally inflicted. Some other cases like Tan Joo Cheng v Public Prosecutor and Public Prosecutor v Lim Poh Lye and Another notably made reference to Visuvanathan's case, and they either agreed or disagreed with the type of approach laid forward by Visuvanathan's case to convict a person of a Section 300(c) murder charge.

In the aftermath of his execution, Visuvanathan's case became a case study inside the 1994 book Mental Disorders and the Law, co-authored by Lee Peng Kok, Molly Cheang and Kuan Tsee Chee, and one of his defences of alcohol intoxication was written in the book as an instance of murder defendants putting up their defence of alcohol intoxication to evade the murder charge during their trials.

N. Sivanandan, the Indian court interpreter of Visuvanathan's trial who retired in the 2010s after five decades on his job, wrote a book about the past high-profile cases where he acted as the interpreter at trial, and the book was published in 2019. Sivanandan stated that the case of Visuvanathan reminded him of many instances where a fight or even murder could arise from alcohol, and it was challenging for him and his colleague to interpret the witnesses' answers and cross-examination from both the prosecution and defence.

== See also ==
- Capital punishment in Singapore
- List of major crimes in Singapore
