= Murder of Khor Gek Hong =

1983 murder of a housewife in Singapore

Khor Gek Hong
- Khor Gek Hong, who was murdered by her lover in 1983
- Born: Khor Gek Hong c. 1959; Colony of Singapore
- Died: 24 October 1983 (aged 24); Singapore General Hospital, Singapore
- Cause of death: Fatal stab wound to the lung
- Occupations: Housewife; Hostess(former)
- Known for: Murder victim
- Spouse: Foo See Teck (m. 1978; her death. 1983)
- Children: 1 son

On 24 October 1983, 24-year-old Singaporean housewife Khor Gek Hong (许玉凤 Xǔ Yùfèng) was attacked and stabbed to death by her lover along Kim Seng Road, Singapore. Khor's lover, 31-year-old welder Wong Foot Ling (黄福麟 Huáng Fúlín), surrendered himself two days after the fatal stabbing, and he was charged with murder. During Wong's trial, it was revealed that Wong was angered at Khor choosing to return to her husband rather than continuing their relationship with one another, and it caused Wong to commit the murder. Although Wong raised the defences of having killed Khor in a fight and killing Khor under a loss of self-control via sudden and grave provocation, the High Court judged that Wong had intentionally stabbed Khor, which in turn caused Khor to die from her wounds and hence, Wong was found guilty of murder and sentenced to death by hanging in August 1984. Wong's appeal was dismissed and he was hanged on 19 September 1986.

== Khor Gek Hong's death ==
On the night of 24 October 1983, a woman was attacked and grievously stabbed by a male attacker while she was waiting for a taxi along Kim Seng Road. Shortly after the ruthless stabbing, the perpetrator was last seen fleeing the area in his car.

The victim, who was pronounced dead at Singapore General Hospital, was identified as 24-year-old Khor Gek Hong, who was an ex-hostess and housewife married with a two-year-old son and the seventh of eight children in her family. The stabbing incident was witnessed by multiple people, and it caused shock among the bystanders who had seen the killer stabbing Khor to death. One of the witnesses, a salesman, told the press that he originally believed it was a spousal conflict when he saw Khor and her assailant struggling with one another, before his thoughts were proven wrong by the man brutally stabbing Khor to death, and he managed to take down the registration number of the vehicle used by Khor's murderer to flee the scene. Reportedly, Khor, despite being mortally wounded, managed to fight off her killer and escaped to a grocery store, where she used a public telephone to call her 51-year-old mother Poh Ah Lee, who rushed down from her 8th floor flat to tend to her daughter. Poh later told police that her daughter was actually attacked and strangled by a man whose feelings were rejected by Khor, who claimed she was happily married to her husband and seaman Foo See Teck (alias Peter), although the family did not make a report after they informed the man's parents about what he did, with hopes to stop the man from coming after Khor. A knife was later recovered from the scene.

Dr Wee Keng Poh, a senior forensic pathologist, conducted a post-mortem examination on the deceased. Dr Wee discovered that Khor had been stabbed a total of ten times with a sharp instrument, and out of all the ten wounds, one of them (measured 6 cm in depth) was inflicted from the back and it penetrated the lung and caused massive bleeding, and this particular injury was sufficient in the ordinary course of nature to cause death.

The murder of Khor Gek Hong was one of two murder cases involving female victims to happen within the same week. The second case was the murder of Wong Ah Peng, a 19-year-old Ipoh-born prostitute found dead with her flat ransacked on 26 October 1983. Wong's murderer, a Kedah-born bread seller named Wong Kim Poh, was arrested five years later in Malaysia in 1988, before he was extradited back to Singapore, where he was tried and sentenced to hang in 1990 for murdering the teenager.

== Investigations ==
The Singapore Police Force classified the death of Khor Gek Hong as murder, and the case was transferred to the Criminal Investigation Department (CID) for official investigations. The police eventually closed in on one suspect, whom they identified as a 31-year-old Singaporean named Wong Foot Ling (alias Ah Beng; 阿明 A Míng), a welder and ex-lover of Khor, and placed him on the wanted list. The police also sent out a public appeal for information leading to Wong's arrest.

On 26 October 1983, Wong surrendered himself to the police for allegedly killing Khor. The following day, 31-year-old Wong Foot Ling was charged with murder in a district court, and subsequently remanded without bail. No plea was recorded from Wong during his appearance in court.

== Trial of Wong Foot Ling ==
Wong Foot Ling
- Wong Foot Ling, who was charged with murdering Khor Gek Hong
- Born: Wong Foot Ling c. 1952; Colony of Singapore
- Died: 19 September 1986 (aged 34); Changi Prison, Singapore
- Cause of death: Execution by hanging
- Other name: Ah Beng
- Occupation: Welder (former)
- Status: Executed
- Motive: Romance issues
- Conviction: Murder (one count)
- Criminal charges: Murder (one count)
- Penalty: Death

On 6 August 1984, ten months after his arrest, Wong Foot Ling was officially brought to trial for the murder of Khor Gek Hong from the previous year. The prosecution was led by Lawrence Ang while Wong himself was represented by Nathan Isaac during his trial, which was presided over by two judges - Justice Abdul Wahab Ghows and Justice T S Sinnathuray.

The trial court was told that prior to Khor's marriage, both Khor and Wong, who were neighbours, had known one another since 1973 and had once shared an intimate relationship with each other. Shortly after Khor was married to Foo See Teck on 11 May 1978, Khor rekindled her relationship with Wong, and while Khor's husband was sailing out, they often would go out together secretly for trips, even having sex on some occasions. Throughout her relationship with Wong, Khor tried several times to seek a divorce but her husband, who knew about the affair through his family, refused to grant her a divorce and wanted to maintain his marriage with Khor, or otherwise he would commit suicide together with their son. Khor also refused Wong's offer to elope with him for the sake of her son. Eventually, Khor chose to stay with her husband and give her marriage a chance. This dashed all of Wong's hopes to marry Khor after splitting with Foo, and according to the prosecution, it became the motive of Wong's merciless attack on Khor before he killed her. It was also noted that Khor often changed her mind between choosing to give her heart to Wong and staying with her husband, which made the judges call her a "fickle-minded" woman in their verdict of Wong's murder trial.

According to Wong's confession, he had tried strangling Khor in a love suicide pact due to her distress over the failure to secure a divorce from her husband, but he could not bring himself to continue on after seeing her suffering, and a day later, he only learned that Khor chose to return to her husband, which greatly saddened Wong. Wong also told the police that on the day of the murder, he was driving along Kim Seng Road when he chanced upon Khor and he decided to approach Khor, offering her a lift. However, Khor refused, and their conversation escalated into an argument over Khor's feelings for both Wong and Foo, and Wong failed to force Khor to go with him into his car. Afterwards, Wong went into his car and retrieved a knife, and he plunged the knife into Khor's back while she was in a kneeling position, and knifed her to death. Chua Aik Hock, the sales representative who took down Wong's car's registration number, testified that he saw Wong stabbing Khor at least five times from behind while Khor was in a kneeling position. Chua's colleague, Shum Sun Seng, corroborated Chua's testimony when he came to court as well. Khor's husband also appeared in court as a witness and he testified that when he and his mother-in-law received a telephone call from the dying Khor, she told her that it was "Ah Beng", which was Wong's alias, who stabbed her.

In his defence, Wong claimed that after approaching Khor moments before the murder, he was scolded by Khor for having revealed to her mother about the two abortions she underwent due to their past intimacy. Wong also testified in court that their argument had gotten worse and it gave rise to the hostility between the couple. Wong also stated that as a result of uncontrollable anger, he went back to his car to retrieve a knife and stabbed Khor. In rebuttal, during their cross-examination, the prosecution sought to argue that Wong had intentionally killed Khor in the "most cruel fashion" after coming to the conclusion that he was never going to have her and the murder resulted from his anger towards her, which Wong continued to deny while on the stand. The defence argued that Wong acted under sudden and grave provocation and killed Khor as a result, and even stated there was a sudden fight erupting between both lovers and Khor's death was an unintended consequence of the fight. The prosecution refuted that Wong's defences should not stand, and they cited that in the absence of an intention to kill, an offender can still be convicted of murder if he/she had intentionally inflicted fatal bodily injuries on the victim, as defined under Section 300(c) of the Penal Code. They also cited that given the number of wounds sustained by the deceased, it cannot be said that Wong had not meant to cause harm to Khor but had the intention to stab Khor, which in turn led to her death.

On 10 August 1984, Justice T S Sinnathuray and Justice Abdul Wahab Ghows delivered their verdict, with Justice Sinnathuray pronouncing the decision in court. In the joint judgement, Justice Sinnathuray found that there was no sudden fight between Khor and Wong, and Khor was in a kneeling position when Wong knifed her to death; she herself was unarmed and wanted to leave. Also, the two judges found that there was no provocation from Khor as she was then on the way to visit a friend and refused the offer by Wong to drive her, which in turn led to Wong murdering her in a fit of anger. Since the judges rejected Wong's defences, and also determined that Wong had the intention to cause bodily injuries during the stabbing, such that one of the wounds caused was sufficient in the ordinary course of nature to cause the death of Khor, Wong's actions constituted an act of murder under the law and the judges thus concluded that there were sufficient grounds to return with a guilty verdict of murder.

Both Justice Sinnathuray and Justice Abdul Wahab found 32-year-old Wong Foot Ling guilty of murdering Khor Gek Hong, and sentenced him to the mandatory death penalty – the sole legal punishment permitted for murder in Singapore – under Section 302 of the Penal Code.

== Appeal ==
In April 1985, it was reported that Wong was in the midst of appealing his conviction and sentence at the Court of Appeal. Similarly, ten out of 15 other people on death row (alongside Wong) were separately filing appeals against the death penalty, most of whom were convicted of either murder or drug trafficking.

On 20 May 1985, Wong lost his appeal against the murder conviction and death sentence. The three judges – Justice Lai Kew Chai, Justice L P Thean (Thean Lip Ping) and Chief Justice Wee Chong Jin – affirmed the trial court's decision to convict Wong of murder based on the reasons they similarly found in Wong's case, and noting that Khor was in a kneeling position when Wong stabbed her several times in front of the witnesses, they had no doubt that Wong had indeed committed murder through the definition of his actions under the law, and therefore confirmed Wong's death sentence and murder conviction. On that same day, another death row convict and killer Tay Cheng Hoe also lost his appeal against the death sentence he received for murdering 19-year-old Yeo Kee Yong over an alleged motorcycle incident at Jalan Kukoh back in June 1981. Tay's death sentence had since been carried out on an unknown date.

== Execution ==
On 19 September 1986, 34-year-old Wong Foot Ling was hanged in Changi Prison at dawn. It was revealed in November 1986 that both Wong and another death row prisoner Ramu Annadavascan had donated their corneas to two women, leaving 18 inmates on death row. Ramu, who was executed on the same day as Wong, was one of two men found guilty of murdering 45-year-old boilerman Kalingam Mariappan in 1981 by battering him with a rake and burning him to death. Ramu's accomplice Rathakrishnan Ramasamy was spared the gallows as he was 16 years old at the time of the murder and he thus served 20 years of detention at the President's Pleasure. The two women who received the corneas of both Wong and Ramu were reportedly recovering well as of November 1986.

== See also ==
- Capital punishment in Singapore
