= Ang Mo Kio family murders =

1983 family mass murder in Singapore

- Soh Lee Lee, the housewife who was one of the three victims killed.
- Date: 28 March 1983
- Location: Ang Mo Kio, Singapore
- Outcome: Tan and Lim found guilty of murder and sentenced to death in 1985; Tan and Lim losing their appeals against the death sentence; Tan committing suicide in May 1990; Lim was executed by hanging at Changi Prison on 5 October 1990
- Deaths: Soh Lee Lee (28); Joyce Yeong Pei Ling (2); Jeremy Yeong Yin Kit (3)
- Injuries: None
- Convicted: Lim Beng Hai (26); Michael Tan Teow (30)
- Verdict: Guilty
- Convictions: Murder (3 counts)
- Sentence: Death penalty

On 28 March 1983, 28-year-old housewife Soh Lee Lee (Note: Chinese: 苏莉莉; pinyin: Sū Lìlì; Pe̍h-ōe-jī: So͘ Lī-lī) and her two young children, three-year-old Jeremy Yeong Yin Kit (Note: Chinese: 杨英杰; pinyin: Yáng Yīngjié; Jyutping: Joeng4 Jing1 Git6) and two-year-old Joyce Yeong Pei Ling, (Note: Chinese: 杨佩玲; pinyin: Yáng Pèilíng; Jyutping: Joeng4 Pui3 Ling4) were murdered inside their flat at Ang Mo Kio. Some of their possessions were stolen from the flat. The police investigated the case and within a month, they arrested two suspects, Lim Beng Hai (Note: Chinese: 林明海 (pinyin: Lín Mínghǎi; Pe̍h-ōe-jī: Lîm Bêng-hái) or 林炳海 (pinyin: Lín Bǐnghǎi; Pe̍h-ōe-jī: Lîm Péng-hái)) and Michael Tan Teow, (Note: Chinese: 陈朝; pinyin: Chén Cháo; Pe̍h-ōe-jī: Tân Tiâu) for the killings. One of them, Tan, was Soh's tenant.

During the trial, both men, who were drug addicts and had committed the murders due to the need for money to procure more drugs, blamed each other for the killings and put up defences that there was no intention to kill but to rob and, additionally, to rape the adult victim. However, the judges deemed that both men were responsible for the murders. They were found guilty and sentenced to death in April 1985. Five years after the trial, Tan committed suicide while on death row; Lim was hung at the gallows for the murders.

== Murders and police investigation ==
Jeremy Yeong, one of the two children killed.

Joyce Yeong, one of the two children killed.

On the evening of 28 March 1983, 33-year-old Yeong Fook Seng, a school laboratory worker, came home from work and discovered the dead bodies of his 28-year-old wife, Soh Lee Lee, and their two children - three-year-old Jeremy Yeong Yin Kit and two-year-old Joyce Yeong Pei Ling - inside their bedroom. Yeong reported the deaths to the police. According to the forensic pathologist, Chao Tzee Cheng, Soh died from a stab wound to the neck, while Jeremy was stabbed once in the neck and bled to death, and Joyce was stabbed eight to nine times.

The police classified the case as murder, and it was believed that there may have been only one assailant. They investigated and found that a radio cassette recorder, a video recorder, and some of Soh's jewellery were missing, and theorized that the possible motive was robbery. After Yeong told police that he rented a room to a man named Ng Gee Soon, who was missing at the time the mother and children were killed, the police brought Ng in for questioning as a suspect. Ng stated he was not the one who rented the room, and admitted that in 1982, when he bought four straws of heroin from a man, he gave the man his identity card as collateral since he did not have enough money to pay for the drugs. The heroin seller, revealed to be Tan Teow (also known as Michael Tan), who actually had rented the room, was arrested and charged with murder on 31 March 1983. The stolen items from the Yeong family flat were recovered by the police.

A month later, on 23 April 1983, having obtained information from Michael Tan, the police put up a public notice for Lim Beng Hai (alias Albert Lim), who was alleged to be Tan's accomplice in the killings. The next day, Lim surrendered to the police, and was charged two days later with murder. Both Lim and Tan were remanded at Changi Prison Hospital for a pre-trial psychiatric evaluation. Tan faced an additional charge of having 8.52g of heroin in his possession.

On 1 August 1983, the case was transferred to the High Court for trial hearing on a later date.

== Trial proceedings ==
=== The prosecution's case ===
The trial of both Lim Beng Hai and Michael Tan began at the High Court on 18 February 1985. Lim was represented by Freddy Neo while Tan was represented by M. Puvanendram, and Edmond Pereira of the Attorney-General's Chambers (AGC) was in charge of the prosecution. Justice Abdul Wahab Ghows and Justice L P Thean were the two trial judges assigned to preside over the hearing. At the start of the prosecution's case, it was revealed that Tan first rented the flat on 1 January 1983, and during the three months he lived there, he often got into arguments with Soh over late rent and her demand that he move out. It was alleged by the prosecution that after the quarrels over rent, Tan formed the intention to rob and kill the victims, as he needed money to buy drugs, and roped Lim into his robbery plan. Tan already had a home and was married with two daughters, but rented the room for the purpose of selling and smoking heroin.

One of the witnesses, Sreedharan Udayakumar, an Indian friend of Tan, testified that on the night of the killings, Tan frantically came to his home to seek shelter and asked him to store a radio cassette recorder and video recorder. When Udayakumar asked him what happened, Tan admitted he robbed his landlady Soh and her two children, but according to Tan, it was Lim who killed them. Dr Naranjan Singh testified that he heard Tan admitting he was part of the robbery, but he stated he only wanted to rape Soh. Tan had said that his friend Lim had killed the victims and robbed them. He also observed both Lim and Tan suffering from moderate to severe drug withdrawal symptoms.

Professor Chao Tzee Cheng, the senior forensic pathologist who conducted the autopsy on the victims, told the court that the victims had been stabbed during the alleged robbery. He demonstrated through a female officer's help how the victims were killed. He first showed the court how the adult victim, Soh, was killed. He told the court that based on the blood splatters on the wall, height of the stains, and the fact that Soh's feet were below the bed, it was likely that Soh was in a kneeling position when she was stabbed inside the bedroom. The scratch marks on her neck showed that her assailant was using one hand to grip her neck to strangle her during the stabbing. Professor Chao also said that either Tan, Lim, or both killed Soh first before they laid their hands on the children, as he noticed that the bodies of both Jeremy Yeong and his sister Joyce fell onto the body of their mother. Professor Chao said the bruises on Jeremy's face were likely due to someone clasping the boy's mouth with the hand, which gave rise to the possibility that there was more than one assailant - one of killed Soh while another restrained the children, before the assailants killed the two children as well.

=== Tan's defence ===
Tan elected to go on the stand to give his defence. However, he suffered from severe drug withdrawal symptoms right before the start of his defence phase, so the trial was postponed for a month until Tan fully recovered. On the stand, Tan challenged the validity of his statements, claiming he did not make them voluntarily. He claimed that he was under the influence of drugs when he made the statements, which he only made for the sake of getting drugs. The police officers denied this and stated Tan made the statements voluntarily. The trial judges ruled that Tan's statements were inadmissible as evidence, since narcotics officers corroborated his story that he had heroin on him at the time of his arrest, and Tan had some withdrawal symptoms before making the statements, which made the judges doubt that he gave his statements voluntarily and in a full conscious state. Due to Tan's allegations that a prison officer supplied him the drugs, a 29-year-old prison warden (who was a Malaysian on a work permit) was found to have supplied heroin to Tan and other inmates, but due to insufficient evidence to formulate a charge against him, the ex-warden was indefinitely detained without trial.

Tan admitted to the court that he rented a room in the flat in January 1983 under an assumed name for the sole purpose of smoking heroin, as his wife always reported him to the police when he used drugs at their Toa Payoh apartment. Tan claimed that it was Lim who killed all three victims. He testified that on the day of the murder, his only intention was to rob the family, while Lim wanted to rape Soh. Tan claimed that after ransacking the flat and packing up the valuables he had stolen from the flat, he heard screams coming from the bedroom, and saw the children lying motionless with blood on their chest and backs. He also saw the children's mother struggling with Lim, who was armed with a knife. According to Tan, he went into the bedroom to break up the fight. During the scuffle, he witnessed Soh running towards Lim, but she accidentally ran into the knife Lim held in his hands, causing the stab wound to her neck. By his admission, Tan claimed he spent more than $2,000 a month on heroin and even trafficked drugs to maintain a stable income, and he thought he could become a millionaire if he never consumed drugs. Tan steadily denied the prosecution's contentions that he had intentionally killed Soh and the children despite their pleas for mercy, and that he had fabricated his account.

=== Lim's defence ===
Lim also elected to give his defence. He denied that he stabbed the victims, and claimed that Tan was responsible for the killings. He stated that he was a regular visitor to Tan's rented room, often going there to buy drugs and smoke heroin. He recalled that on the day they killed the children and Soh, Tan expressed his unhappiness that Soh pestered him about the rent, and suggested robbing Soh since he needed money. Lim decided to join despite declining the offer at first, and he also testified Tan wanted to rape Soh. During the execution of the robbery, Lim ran outside the flat while Tan was struggling with Soh inside the living room, with the two children crying in fright nearby.

=== Prosecution's rebuttals ===
The prosecution argued that there was no doubt that the two defendants were culpable of the "brutal and wanton" killings of the Yeong children and Soh. Pereira, who made the prosecution's arguments, also highlighted that the men's accounts of how the killings occurred were inconsistent with medical evidence, which described the victim Soh being stabbed while in a kneeling position rather than standing (as Tan claimed) or lying down (as Lim claimed), and that the children were being restrained when Soh was stabbed. It was therefore reasonable to infer that more than one person had been responsible for killing the three victims. Pereira also stated that both men had tried to fabricate stories to deflect blame from themselves, so their testimonies should be rejected. Pereira urged the court to convict both men of murder. The verdict was scheduled to be given on 10 April 1985.

== Verdict ==
Michael Tan, one of the two murder defendants sentenced to death.

Lim Beng Hai, one of the two murder defendants sentenced to death.

On 10 April 1985, after hearing the case for ten days, the trial judges - Justice Abdul Wahab Ghows and Justice L P Thean - delivered their verdict.

In the 34-page verdict, Justice Abdul Wahab explained that the judges were in agreement that the two men shared a common intention to steal from the victims, and in furtherance of that intention, they had viciously and savagely stabbed the children and their mother. In the case of Michael Tan, Justice Abdul Wahab rejected Tan's defence that the first victim, Soh Lee Lee, accidentally ran into the knife. Instead, the medical evidence and scratches on Tan's neck and chest suggested that Soh had put up a struggle while Tan strangled Soh and intentionally plunged the knife into her neck, which caused her death. Tan's claims of diminished responsibility by influence of drugs, as well as his contention that he alone wanted to rob and Lim alone wanted to rape Soh, were all rejected by the judges,since the evidence demonstrated the defendants shared the common intention to steal from the victims and humiliate Soh.

Turning to the case of Lim Beng Hai, Justice Abdul Wahab stated that it was unbelievable that Lim, who was present at the scene of the crime throughout the killings, did not partake in the homicides. The evidence showed that not only did he participate in Tan's plan to commit theft, Lim had also restrained the children while Soh was stabbed by Tan, and assaulted the boy Jeremy to keep him silent. He was deemed to have abetted Tan in facilitating the stabbing of Soh. Justice Abdul Wahab stated it was immaterial to know was who exactly killed the children, as the children were clearly stabbed with the intention to kill, so as not to leave witnesses who could identify the killers. Lim should therefore bear full responsibility for being an accessory to the murder of the children. The diminished responsibility defence raised by Lim was also not accepted.

Both 32-year-old Michael Tan and 28-year-old Lim Beng Hai were found guilty of three counts of murder and sentenced to death. Justice L P Thean pronounced the triple death sentences, one for each count of murder, for both men in a packed courtroom, where everyone was ordered to stand. Tan's wife wept at the verdict while Yeong Fook Seng expressed his relief at the end of the ordeal, but remained sad for losing his wife and children, whom he described as his "everything".

After her husband was sentenced to death, Tan's 31-year-old wife, who was Malaysian-born and a native of Negeri Sembilan, told the press that after her mother died at age five and her father, an opium addict, sold her off to Singapore for $500 to buy drugs, she lived at a temple in Singapore. In 1973, she first met Tan in a coffee shop at Changi and they married six months later. Tan's wife stated that despite their lack of money, Tan was always good to her and their two daughters (the younger lived with the mother while the elder was sent to a welfare home), and would do anything to bring income and happiness to the family. Tan's wife confessed she never knew that her husband would commit such a heinous act for cash, and expressed her regret for not preventing him from stepping on the wrong path. It was further revealed that Tan was a former celebrity who first made his name in 1970 as "Mr Personality", and had once starred in a sentimental Indonesian film.

After Lim and Tan were both sentenced to death, they became one of the sixteen inmates on Singapore's death row awaiting execution as of April 1985. These inmates included infamous child killer Adrian Lim, who faced the gallows for killing two children, and lorry driver Ramu Annadavascan, who murdered a boilerman, Kalingam Mariappan, by hitting him with a rake and burning him alive using petrol as an accelerant.

== Fates of Lim and Tan ==
=== Appeal processes ===
On 18 May 1987, both Lim Beng Hai and Michael Tan lost their appeals to the Court of Appeal against the death sentences they received for killing Soh and her children. Without calling for the prosecution's submissions, the three judges - Chief Justice Wee Chong Jin, Justice F A Chua and Justice Lai Kew Chai - rejected the men's claims of diminished responsibility since both men were not under the influence of drugs, were fully aware of their crimes, and able to differentiate right from wrong.

The men later applied for special leave to appeal to the Privy Council in London in a bid to overturn their sentences, but in 1989, the men's applications were all rejected by the Privy Council.

=== Tan's death ===
On 8 May 1990, while he was in solitary confinement in death row pending execution, 37-year-old Michael Tan Teow was found dead inside his cell at Changi Prison by a warden. Despite efforts by officers to revive him, Tan was pronounced dead at the scene by paramedics. At the time of his death, Tan was survived by his wife, two daughters (aged 18 and 14 at this point), his elderly mother and Jewish stepfather. According to Tan's 58-year-old mother, she felt regret for her son going astray due to lack of parental love, and stated she never knew about her son's crime until she read the paper. She revealed that her first husband abandoned her when Tan, who was her only child, was merely one month old, and she had entrusted her child to his grandparents while she went on to marry a Jewish man. She had been in less with her son, whom she last visited in jail during the Chinese New Year season of 1990.

On 26 September 1990, during a coroner's inquiry into Tan's death, State Coroner Yap Chee Leong recorded a verdict of suicide, concluding that Tan had died as by an overdose of prescription pills, which were meant for his hypertension. It was not known how long Tan hoarded or accumulated the large amount of drugs he consumed before his overdose. With Tan's death, his accomplice Lim was the only person left awaiting execution for the Ang Mo Kio murders. Lim's death warrant was underway to facilitate the date for his hanging.

=== Lim's execution ===
On 5 October 1990, more than seven years after committing the murders at Ang Mo Kio, 33-year-old Lim Beng Hai was hanged at dawn in Changi Prison.

== Aftermath ==
Nineteen years after the Ang Mo Kio murder case, the Singaporean crime show True Files re-enacted the murders, which aired on 30 May 2002 as the ninth episode of the show's first season. The names of the victims were redacted to protect their identities, while Lim Beng Hai and Michael Tan were addressed solely by their surnames. For unknown reasons, the murdered boy, Jeremy Yeong, was not depicted in the re-enactment, despite the depiction of his mother, Soh Lee Lee, and sister, Joyce Yeong, although the dialogue of the characters emphasized that there were three victims. The former trial prosecutor, Edmond Pereira, who eventually left his prosecutor job to switch to private practice and open his own law firm, was interviewed in the episode, stating that he felt sorry for the victims and that without the forensic evidence, the killings would not have been solved.

The Ang Mo Kio case was also one of the notable cases solved by Professor Chao Tzee Cheng, the senior forensic pathologist. It was later re-enacted by the Singaporean crime show Whispers of the Dead in 2014. Both the killers Tan and Lim were renamed as Kelvin Tay and Lee Soo Han, respectively, for dramatic purposes, while Soh Lee Lee, Jeremy Yeong and Joyce Yeong were renamed as Mei Shan, Alan and Lisa for dramatic purposes and to protect their identities. The overall events and trial proceedings remained reminiscent of the real life events.

== See also ==
- Capital punishment in Singapore
