= Murder of Samynathan Pawathai =

1985 murder of an ice factory worker in Singapore

Samynathan Pawathai
- Born: Samynathan Pawathai; 1947; Colony of Singapore
- Died: 28 April 1985 (aged 38); Tanjong Rhu, Singapore
- Cause of death: Fatal slash wound to the liver
- Other names: Chelia Dorai
- Occupation: Ice factory worker
- Employer: Nanyang Chinese Ice Factory
- Known for: Murder victim

On 28 April 1985, at his workplace in Tanjong Rhu, 38-year-old ice factory worker Samynathan Pawathai, alias Chelia Dorai, was attacked by eight men who sought revenge against one of Samynathan's friends, who hurt one of the attackers in an earlier fight, and Samynathan died as a result of grievous injuries sustained from the attack. Out of the eight murderers, only five were caught and charged with murder, while the remaining three perpetrators went on the run till today. Out of the five, two of the attackers - Abdul Ghaffur Parith Mohamed Kassim and S. Ganesan Shanmugam- were each jailed six years for manslaughter, while the other three - Kumar Nadison, Jabar Kadermastan and Chandran Gangatharan - were found guilty of murdering Samynathan and sentenced to death. The trio were hanged on 28 April 1995 after all their appeals were rejected.

== Murder investigation ==
On 28 April 1985, at an ice factory in Tanjong Rhu, at least two workers were attacked by a group of armed men at their workplace, and they were seriously injured as a result of the attack; the two men were said to have been struck by an axe. One of the men, identified as 38-year-old Samynathan Pawathai, died in hospital while the remaining victim survived with timely medical intervention.

An autopsy was later conducted by Dr Wee Keng Poh, a forensic pathologist, and he found that Samynathan suffered a total of 18 injuries on his body, and one of the slash wounds had penetrated his liver and led to a massive loss of blood, and his opinion was that the wound was sufficient in the ordinary course of nature to cause death. Following the death of Samynathan, the police classified the case as murder and conducted their investigations.

Within a day after the crime, the police managed to round up five suspects allegedly responsible for Samynathan's murder, and the five men - Abdul Ghaffur Parith Mohamed Kassim, Chandran Gangatharan, Kumar Nadison, Jabar Kadermastan and S. Ganesan Shanmugam - were charged with murder. The five men and another three people were all said to be Malaysians, and they were accused of being members of an unlawful assembly and having a common object of causing grievous hurt to Samynathan, which thus resulted in Samynathan's death. However, the remaining three perpetrators behind the case were not identified, and they were never caught. If found guilty of murder under Singaporean law, the five men would be sentenced to death.

In April 1986, after a pre-trial conference, the district court ordered all the five men to stand trial at the High Court for murder.

== Court proceedings ==
=== Trials of Abdul Ghaffur and Ganesan ===
On 31 October 1988, both 25-year-old Abdul Ghaffur Parith Mohamed Kassim and 28-year-old S. Ganesan Shanmugam pleaded guilty to lesser charges of manslaughter, after the murder charges against them were dropped, which allowed them to no longer face the death penalty for murdering Samynathan Pawathai, while the remaining three perpetrators were confirmed to stand trial for murder in a separate court session on the same day.

On the same date, Justice Chan Sek Keong, who heard their cases in a separate court, decided to sentence both Ganesan and Abdul Gaffur to six years of imprisonment each. He stated that the attack was a disproportionate reaction to the earlier dispute that left one of their friends hurt, and there could have been better ways to mediate the conflict. Justice Chan also added that he accepted that both Abdul Ghaffur and Ganesan had no intention to cause death, even though they wielded lethal weapons that were capable of causing serious injury or death, and he took into consideration the fact that the pair had been drinking alcohol prior to the attack, which may have influenced their decision to tag along with their other six accomplices to wallop Suppiah.

=== Murder trial of Chandran, Jabar and Kumar ===
The murder trial of Chandran Gangatharan, Jabar Kadermastan and Kumar Nadison took place on 31 October 1988. The trial was presided over by two trial judges - High Court judge L P Thean (Thean Lip Ping) and Judicial Commissioner Chao Hick Tin - in the High Court.

The trial court was told that prior to Samynathan's murder, the three defendants of the trial, as well as Ganesan, Abdul Ghaffur and the missing three accomplices were involved in previous physical altercations with Samynathan and friends, which led to the killing of Samynathan. The first was on 27 December 1984, when Samynathan's friend Suppiah Arumugam, who was in charge of supplying labourers to the ice factory, was together with three friends at Tanjong Pagar Plaza when Kumar and some other men confronted Suppiah about a gold chain he snatched, and this caused Suppiah to be assaulted. The second was on 22 April 1985, when Samynathan got into a fight with Jabar at Tanjong Pagar Road, and Jabar's left palm was slashed as a result. Six days later, on 28 April 1985, the date of the murder, the eight perpetrators of the case decided during a drinks session that they should attack Suppiah and his friends to seek vengeance against them for Jabar's injury. Afterwards, the eight men were armed with metal poles, axes, swords and parangs and headed to the ice factory to attack Suppiah and his friends. At that time, Suppiah was not present at the factory, and only Samynathan and his two friends were present, and they were thus targeted and brutally attacked, leading to Samynathan's death and one of his friends seriously injured. All three accused were later called to enter their defence, after the trial court ruled that there was a case to answer, and they put up a defence that they never intended to cause death, and their only intention was to attack Suppiah and not the others, and they were provoked into fighting Samynathan and the others, while the death of Samynathan was caused during a fight. On these grounds, the defence sought to have their clients ruled not guilty of murder. The judgement was reserved on 2 December 1988.

On 11 May 1989, Judicial Commissioner Chao Hick Tin and Justice L P Thean delivered their verdict. Judicial Commissioner Chao, who pronounced the judgement in court, stated that there was a clear intention by all the eight members of the gang to initiate an attack out of revenge, and the three defendants and their other five accomplices had a common intention to cause grievous hurt to Suppiah and his friends, including Samynathan, for having assaulted and injured Jabar in an earlier dispute. In turn, the judges rejected the trio's defence that they were only going after Suppiah and wanted to harm only Suppiah. Judicial Commissioner Chao also pointed out that the trio and the other offenders were the ones that took undue advantage of the situation, and hence their defences of sudden fight and provocation were rejected. He also stated that while the trio were not the ones who inflicted the fatal wounds on Samynathan, they were considered to have committed the crime of murder due to the legal doctrine of common intention, since the lethal injuries inflicted on Samynathan were done intentionally and in furtherance of the common intention shared by all the eight perpetrators behind the attack that cost Samynathan his life.

Therefore, all the three accused - 32-year-old Kumar Nadison, 27-year-old Jabar Kadermastan and 26-year-old Chandran Gangatharan - were found guilty of murder and sentenced to death by hanging.

== Appeal processes ==
On 25 April 1991, the Court of Appeal dismissed the appeals of the trio against their convictions and sentences for the murder of Samynathan Pawathai. Chief Justice Yong Pung How and two High Court judges Lai Kew Chai and Goh Joon Seng heard the case, and they agreed with the trial court's decision to convict the trio of murder.

Subsequently, two of the appellants, Kumar Nadison and Jabar Kadermastan, turned to one final recourse of appealing to the President of Singapore for clemency, while the third appellant, Chandran Gangatharan, did not petition for clemency. Subsequently, after several delays throughout the next three years, Kumar informed the prison authorities in March 1994 that he decided to not proceed with his clemency application, which left Jabar the sole member of the trio to continue with his clemency process. Jabar's first plea for clemency was submitted through his sister on 29 July 1991, and a second one was also filed on 1 August 1991 and a third petition was launched on 13 July 1993. Ultimately, President Ong Teng Cheong decided to not grant Jabar clemency and rejected his plea on 7 June 1994. A death warrant was finalized and Jabar, together with Chandran and Kumar, were scheduled to be executed on 17 June 1994.

However, Jabar successfully applied for a respite from the President, after his lawyers raised the fact that Kumar submitted an affidavit to assume responsibility for having caused the fatal wounds on Samynathan, and a stay of execution was granted. Jabar was also allowed to make a fourth clemency appeal and it was submitted on 27 August 1994, and after another two months, President Ong rejected the fourth clemency motion on 25 October 1994, making Jabar to lose another chance of escaping the gallows.

== Jabar's constitutional challenge ==
After Jabar Kadermastan lost his fourth clemency plea, a second death warrant was issued, scheduling for Jabar and his two accomplices to hang on 11 November 1994.

On 10 November 1994, the eve of his execution, Jabar filed a motion to the High Court, and the triple executions were therefore postponed for the second time while Jabar's appeal was pending before the courts. Jabar's defence lawyer S. K. Kumar argued that it was unconstitutional to hang Jabar after he spent more than five years on death row since his sentencing, regardless of whoever was responsible for the delay. However, the prosecutor Bala Reddy argued that the delay was not done in any part from the authorities, and Jabar was to blame for the delay since he took more than five years to use up any legal means to delay his execution and his actions were tantamount to an abuse of the court processes, and he also spent time with his family to push for clemency on several attempts.

In the end, the motion was dismissed by Judicial Commissioner Kan Ting Chiu, who found that Jabar was entirely responsible for the delay in his execution and he had not proven that it was illegal and unconstitutional to delay his execution until five years after his sentencing, and while an offender had open access to any legal means available to him, the events and circumstances between the time of his conviction and the scheduled time of his execution should also be taken into account. Aside from dismissing Jabar's grounds of appeal, Judicial Commissioner Kan stepped aside to acknowledge that it was unconstitutional to carry an offender's death sentence if the delay in executing the offender was prolonged and unreasonable on the part of the authorities, and this was affirmed in a precedent case by the Indian Supreme Court, where it quoted that:

"The prolonged anguish of alternating hope and despair, the agony of uncertainty, the consequences of such suffering on the mental, emotional and physical integrity and health of the individual can render the decision to execute the sentence of death an inhuman and degrading punishment."

Subsequently, Jabar brought his case forward to the Court of Appeal to review Judicial Commissioner Kan's ruling. On 24 February 1995, the three-judge panel, consisting of Chief Justice Yong Pung How, and Judges of Appeal L P Thean (Thean Lip Ping) and M Karthigesu, rejected Jabar's appeal. They affirmed Judicial Commissioner Kan's verdict and stated that the President of Singapore had the sole prerogative to decide whether to commute an offender's death sentence to life imprisonment, and it was not in the court's ability to fulfill such an outcome, and on this ground alone, they decided to dismiss Jabar's appeal. Given that Jabar's defence counsel raised several precedent cases from India to support his appeal, Chief Justice Yong, who pronounced the decision in court, ruled that these cases were irrelevant, and he said that unlike Singapore, India prescribes either the death penalty or life imprisonment (with or without the possibility of parole) for murder, and it was up to the Indian courts as legally bound to decide whether or not the prolonged delays in carrying out an execution warranted the commutation of a death sentence to life imprisonment, while Singapore warranted the mandatory death penalty for all cases of murder, and once the death penalty was confirmed by the Court of Appeal, there was no discretion for the Singaporean courts to decide if the sentence of death should be delayed or commuted. Chief Justice Yong also acknowledged that it was indeed unacceptable for a person to death row to spend a prolonged time of imprisonment before execution, and there was no doubt they would feel a certain amount of anguish and mental agony while awaiting execution, and this was an inevitable consequence which death row inmates had to face and it did not have any bearing on their constitutional rights.

With the dismissal of his appeal, Jabar effectively lost his final bid to escape the gallows, and soon after, a third death warrant was given and Jabar was scheduled to be put to death on 28 April 1995, which coincided with the tenth death anniversary of Samynathan, and at the same time, both Kumar Nadison and Chandran Gangatharan were due to hang on the same date as Jabar. Amnesty International, having received news of the upcoming triple executions, appealed to the Singapore government to stay their executions and commute their death sentences to life imprisonment.

== Executions of the trio ==
During the time while Jabar Kadermastan was appealing against his sentence, the remaining two murderers, Chandran Gangatharan and Kumar Nadison, remained on death row awaiting their executions, and they did not file any additional appeals with regards to their case, even after their execution date had been set.

One of the death row perpetrators, Kumar, gained media attention in a different manner compared to Jabar after the hanging. During his incarceration on death row, Kumar gradually became devoted to Buddhism since 1993, and he also showed remorse for murdering Samynathan back in 1985. A senior monk of Poh Toh Si Temple, who often held Buddhist sessions in Changi Prison, stated that Kumar spent his time on death row to study Buddhism and in 1994, a year before he was scheduled to hang, Kumar expressed his wish to be ordained as a monk. The monks of the temple were eventually granted permission to conduct the rites, and Kumar was thus converted as a monk inside prison, and he was believed to be the first prisoner to be ordained as a monk while on death row. It was also reported that after he became a monk, Kumar, who was given a Buddhist name "Dao Ren" (道忍 Dào Rěn), refrained from eating meat, and he turned to vegetarian food, eating one meal per day. As Kumar's daily prison meals were the same as the other inmates, Kumar was allowed to give away all the meat included in his food and he would keep the vegetarian ones for himself.

On the Friday morning of 28 April 1995, the three murderers - Kumar Nadison, Jabar Kadermastan and Chandran Gangatharan - were hanged in Changi Prison. After the executions, Kumar was given a funeral in accordance to Buddhist rites, and Kumar's family, including his elderly mother and relatives, attended the funeral and they did not object to Kumar's decision to become a monk. The monks arranged for Kumar to be cremated after the funeral wake, and his ashes would be scattered in the sea. Amnesty International also confirmed in May 1995 that the trio were put to death as scheduled in their death warrants.

In the aftermath of his execution, Jabar's constitutional challenge became a landmark case in Singapore's legal history, where it concerned the substantive review of legislation by the court and constitution. The case was first reportedly cited on 6 June 1995, when a drug trafficker named Yee Kim Yeou argued that his clemency petition was rejected only two years after he filed it and he also spent five years on death row, more than three times the average stay on death row, and his death sentence should be ruled unconstitutional, which were similar to Jabar's case. However, the motion was rejected on similar grounds as Jabar's case. Yee, together with his three accomplices (Melvin Seet, Tan Siew Chay and Ng Teo Chye) were hanged two days later on 8 June 1995. A fifth man, Tan Siang Leng, was initially also convicted but in the end, he was acquitted upon his appeal and released at that point.

Since then, the remaining three killers involved in Samynathan's death were never caught as of today. Both Abdul Ghaffur and Ganesan, who were sentenced to six years in prison for manslaughter in this case, were released since 1991.

== See also ==
- Capital punishment in Singapore
