= Murder of Wong Thng Kiat =

1974 murder of a vice ring operator in Singapore

Wong Thng Kiat
- Wong Thng Kiat, the murder victim
- Born: Wong Thng Kiat c. 1952; Colony of Singapore
- Died: 5 December 1974 (aged 22); Kramat Road, Orchard Road, Singapore
- Cause of death: Fatal knife wound to the head
- Other name: Steven
- Occupations: Lorry driver Call-girl syndicate operator
- Known for: Murder victim

On 5 December 1974, at Kramat Road off Orchard Road, 22-year-old Wong Thng Kiat (王昌权, ; Bǽh-oe-tu: Uâng Siang-hiân ), the operator of a call-girl syndicate, was stabbed to death after he got into a fight with another man who used a knife to stab him, and the fight arose from a quarrel over a missing gold bracelet. Within a few days, the killer, 21-year-old Tay Eng Whatt (Chinese: 郑永发; Pe̍h-ōe-jī: Tēⁿ Éng-hoat), was arrested and charged with murder. On 23 July 1976, Tay was found guilty and sentenced to hang for the murder, after the trial court rejected his defence that he killed Wong as a result of a fight and self-defence. Tay's appeals were later dismissed by both the Singaporean Court of Appeal and Privy Council in London, and on 29 June 1979, Tay was put to death in Changi Prison.

== Fatal stabbing of Wong ==
On the night of 5 December 1974, at Kramat Road off Orchard Road, a man was grievously stabbed several times before he died.

First-hand witness accounts revealed that before the stabbing incident, a couple, identified as the victim and his girlfriend, was walking along Kramat Road when they met another couple, and after this, the two women engaged in a heated argument over a matter, and as the women fought, the victim intervened to help his girlfriend and this led to the male partner of the other woman brandishing a knife and stab the victim. The victim, identified as 22-year-old lorry driver Wong Thng Kiat, died as a result of the stabbing, and had stab wounds on his head, shoulders and hands. Wong's 18-year-old girlfriend Ng Poh Sua (alias Lilian), who was not stabbed, ran into a hotel to call the police. She reportedly told the police that she knew the woman, who used to be her roommate, and they argued over some missing jewellery, which likely led to the stabbing of her boyfriend.

An autopsy was later conducted by Dr Seah Han Cheow, a forensic pathologist who would later appear as a witness during the trial of the murderer (who surrendered himself three days later). Dr Seah found that out of all the stab wounds on Wong's corpse, one of them was inflicted close to Wong's right temple and eye, and the wound, which measured 5 cm deep, had penetrated the brain and caused serious damage. Dr Seah testified that this particular injury was sufficient in the ordinary course of nature to cause the death of 22-year-old Wong, who reportedly operated a call-girl syndicate prior to the murder.

== Murder charge ==
After the stabbing incident, the police launched a nationwide manhunt for the couple whom they suspected to be involved in the murder, and the victim Wong Thng Kiat's girlfriend was also brought in for questioning regarding the matter. Subsequently, two men were reported to have given their assistance in investigations during a police probe.

On 9 December 1974, it was reported that a 21-year-old unemployed man, whose name was Tay Eng Whatt, was arrested and charged with murder, and he was remanded for a week at the Criminal Investigation Department (CID) to assist in police investigations. As the charge of murder which Tay faced came under Section 302 of the Penal Code, if Tay was found guilty of murdering Wong under this section, he would be given the mandatory death sentence upon his conviction. Tay was scheduled to return to court on 16 December 1974, and was later remanded while pending trial.

== Trial of Tay Eng Whatt ==
Tay Eng Whatt
- Tay Eng Whatt, who was brought to trial for murdering Wong Thng Kiat
- Born: Tay Eng Whatt c. 1953; Colony of Singapore
- Died: 29 June 1979 (aged 26); Changi Prison, Singapore
- Cause of death: Execution by hanging
- Occupation: Unemployed
- Status: Executed
- Conviction: Murder (one count)
- Criminal charges: 1st charge: Murder of Wong Thng Kiat
- Penalty: Death by hanging

On 14 July 1976, Tay Eng Whatt stood trial at the High Court for one count of murdering Wong Thng Kiat back in December 1974. Tay was represented by Cheong Kok Fu and Nathan Isaac, while the prosecution was led by Lawrence Ang. The trial was presided over by Justice D C D’Cotta and Justice T Kulasekaram.

The trial court was told that a day before the murder, Wong's girlfriend Ng Poh Sua and another call-girl named Lim Meng Jiong (alias Jenny) had a fight over a missing gold bracelet. After the fight subsided, the two women decided to settle between themselves and to not argue over this any longer. However, Lim’s boyfriend, revealed to be the defendant Tay Eng Whatt, found out about the fight after he first noticed a scratch mark on his girlfriend and inquired her about it. Angered over the incident, Tay, together with Lim, went to confront Wong and Ng at Kamrat Road the following night, and Tay demanded that Wong slap his girlfriend in order to “save face” for himself, and Wong refused to. This led to another fight between the two couples, and Tay used a knife to stab Wong to death in the course of the fight before he and Lim fled the scene. Toh Kim Hong (alias Ah Leong) and Goh Ee (alias Ah Hong), who were both present at the scene and knew Wong, testified that they saw Tay taking out the knife during the dispute and had stabbed Wong to death. Lim was not charged for her involvement in the case.

Tay's lawyers told the court that their main defence against the murder charge was that the killing was done out of self-defence. When Tay was called to testify in his defence, he denied that he was the owner of the knife used to stab Wong. Instead, he fingered Wong as the person who was armed with the knife. Tay recounted under oath that on that fateful night, when he and Lim were arguing with both Ng and Wong, Wong suddenly took out the knife and wanted to hurt Tay, and during the scuffle, Tay disarmed Wong and gained possession of the knife and swung it at Wong to prevent Wong from attacking him, which resulted in the stabbing itself. From this, Tay claimed that the death of Wong resulted from Tay acting in self-defence and admitted that while he indeed stabbed Wong, he never had any intention to commit murder all along.

On 22 July 1976, Justice T Kulasekaram and Justice D C D’Cotta delivered their verdict. Justice Kulasekaram, who pronounced the decision in court, stated that based on witness testimony, it was more likely that the knife belonged to Tay, and Tay had truly armed himself before he went to confront Wong, and had first brandished it before stabbing Wong to death, and Justice Kulasekaram stated that both he and Justice D’Cotta did not believe Tay’s story that the knife belonged to Wong or that Wong first took out the knife before Tay gained possession of it and harmed Wong. Having rejected Tay’s account, the judge in turn rejected Tay’s claim that he acted in self-defence, as Tay clearly exceeded his right to self-defence, even if acknowledging that the knife belonged to Wong, since Tay, who alone was armed, took undue advantage and attacked the unarmed Wong. Given the fact that Tay intentionally stabbed Wong several times, and one of the stab wounds inflicted on Wong’s head was sufficient in the ordinary course of nature to cause death, not excluding the fact that Tay had the intent to cause death, the trial judges concluded that there were sufficient grounds to return with a verdict of murder in Tay’s case.

Therefore, 23-year-old Tay Eng Whatt was found guilty of murder, and sentenced to death. Under Singaporean law, the death penalty was mandated as the sole punishment for murder upon an offender’s conviction for murder in Singapore’s jurisdiction.

== Appeal processes ==
On 11 October 1977, through his new lawyer David Saul Marshall, Tay Eng Whatt filed an appeal to the Court of Appeal against his conviction and sentence. However, the three appellate judges - Chief Justice Wee Chong Jin, Justice Choor Singh and Justice Arumugam Ponnu Rajah (or A. P. Rajah) - rejected Tay’s appeal and found that the trial court was correct to convict Tay of murder, as there was an inherently clear intention on Tay’s part to commit murder when he brought a knife along with him before the confrontation with Wong Thng Kiat and he had an intent to cause death by inflicting fatal injuries on Wong.

On 6 February 1979, Tay applied for special leave to appeal to the Privy Council in London for a review of his case. However, the Privy Council refused to grant Tay’s motion and hence Tay lost his final court bid to escape the gallows. On that same day itself, Teoh Soon Lee, another Singaporean who was sentenced to hang for the 1975 murder of Koh Ah Peng, had also lost his petition for an appeal to the Privy Council against his conviction.

As of April 1979, Tay was one of the 29 people held on death row for murder and drug trafficking at Singapore's Changi Prison, the only prison in Singapore where judicial executions were carried out by hanging, the only method of execution allowed in Singapore. Tay was one of the four people who had exhausted all their avenues of appeal and left with a final recourse to petition for presidential clemency, which may enabled a convict's death sentence be commuted to life imprisonment, but it was unknown if Tay had done so.

== Execution ==
On 29 June 1979, after he finished his last breakfast, 26-year-old Tay Eng Whatt was hanged in Changi Prison at dawn. When the authorities announced his execution, Tay was reported to be the fifth person executed in Singapore during the year of 1979.

== See also ==
- Capital punishment in Singapore
