= Murder of Mohamed Shafiqul Islam =

1988 murder of a Bangladeshi worker in Singapore

- A photo of Mohamed Shafiqul's corpse being taken away by two men from the crime scene
- Location: Jalan Kampong Chantek, Dunearn Road, Bukit Timah, Singapore
- Date: 22 January 1988
- Attack type: Murder
- Weapon: Crank handle
- Deaths: 1
- Injuries: 0
- Victim: Mohamed Shafiqul Islam (20)
- Perpetrators: Mohamed Bachu Miah (32); Mohamed Mahmuduzzaman Khan (26)
- Motive: Vengeance
- Charges: Murder
- Verdict: Both accused found guilty of murder Condemned to death on 27 March 1991; Hanged on 23 July 1993
- Convictions: Murder
- Convicted: Mohamed Bachu Miah (32); Mohamed Mahmuduzzaman Khan (26)
- Judge: T S Sinnathuray; M P H Rubin

On 22 January 1988, 20-year-old Bangladeshi national Mohamed Shafiqul Islam, alias Mohd Abdul Islam, was found murdered at a construction site at Bukit Timah, with his genitals severed off. Within the following month, the police managed to apprehend two Bangladeshi workers, who were responsible for causing Mohamed Shafiqul's death. The two suspects - Mohamed Bachu Miah and Mohamed Mahmuduzzaman Khan - were revealed to have killed Mohamed Shafiqul after the former's younger brother was arrested for illegally working in Singapore due to Mohamed Shafiqul allegedly reporting the matter to the police, which made Mohamed Bachu angered and therefore conspired with Mahmuduzzaman to kill Mohamed Shafiqul. After standing trial for 18 days in March 1991, Mohamed Bachu and Mahmuduzzaman were both found guilty of murdering Mohamed Shafiqul and condemned to death by the High Court. Both the murderers were hanged on 23 July 1993 after their appeals were dismissed by the higher courts and the President of Singapore.

== Murder ==
Mohamed Shafiqul Islam
- Born: Mohamed Shafiqul Islam c. 1968; Bangladesh
- Died: 22 January 1988 (aged 20); Jalan Kampong Chantek, Dunearn Road, Singapore
- Cause of death: Fatal skull fracture and a broken neck
- Other name: Mohd Abdul Islam
- Occupation: Construction worker
- Employer: Ong Huat Construction Company (former)
- Known for: Murder victim

On 22 January 1988, at a construction site located in Jalan Kampong Chantek off Dunearn Road, Bukit Timah, several workers were clocking in for work at around 8am when they found that the door to a storage container was still locked. Even though the workers repeatedly knocked on the door, there was still no response and therefore, the workers decided to force the door open. After they broke the door open, the workers discovered the dead body of a man inside the container.

The deceased, a Bangladeshi construction worker named Mohamed Shafiqul Islam, was found with his head smashed in, his shirt unbuttoned and his blue jeans unzipped, but the most shocking aspect of the discovery was, Mohamed Shafiqul's genitals were also found to have been chopped off and placed beside his corpse. Mohamed Shafiqul, also known by the alias Mohd Abdul Islam, was 20 years old at the time of his death. This was the second murder case within less than one year where a man was found murdered with his genitals severed; in May 1987 at Yishun, a Malaysian sub-contractor named Ang Pai Chiou was also killed and had his genitals cut off by three robbers from Malaysia; two of the perpetrators, Ahmad Shukor and Zainudin Mat Zin, were arrested, convicted and sentenced to death for murder in 1990, while the third suspect "Rosli" remains at large till today.

Sources revealed that Mohamed Shafiqul was last seen alive at 7.45pm the night before, after he was given a lift to a nearby hawker centre for dinner. Three Thai workers, who left at 8pm to meet their friends before returning at 1am, hours before the discovery of the corpse, were interviewed and they stated that they never noticed something amiss, and never knew what could have happened. Additionally, Mohamed Shafiqul's employer, 66-year-old Ng Keng Lim of Ong Huat Construction Company, told the press that Mohamed Shafiqul was a good and hardworking worker, and he worked in the site for only eight months.

Dr Clarence Tan, the forensic pathologist, conducted an autopsy on the victim. In his report, Dr Tan found skull fractures on the head, which were caused by multiple blows to the left side of Mohamed Shafiqul's face and head, and these were sufficient in the ordinary course of nature to cause death, and the victim's neck was similarly broken, and it was also fatal as well. A bloodstained crank handle was also recovered at the scene, and the police believed it was the murder weapon used by the killer(s) responsible for Mohamed Shafiqul's death.

== Investigations ==
Having classified the case as murder, the police conducted their investigations by interviewing the foreign workers who knew Mohamed Shafiqul. They also found that a wallet and a pair of shoes belonging to the victim was missing from the workplace. With this clue, the police were eventually able to capture a suspect, who was found wearing the same shoes that were stolen from Mohamed Shafiqul.

On 2 February 1988, a police spokesperson announced to the public that the investigations led to the arrest of three suspects altogether for the murder of Mohamed Shafiqul, and two of them would be charged in court with murder while the third was still assisting in investigations at that point. It was pieced together through the facts uncovered that the killing was done out of a possible motive of revenge, as there was an illegal immigrant from Bangladesh being repatriated after being arrested by the immigration authorities, and one of the perpetrators was the older brother of the immigrant, and the victim was suspected to have reported the immigrant to the police. On that same day, the two suspects, Mohamed Bachu Miah and Mohamed Mahmuduzzaman Khan, were charged with murder, and both men were ordered to be remanded for further investigations and to await trial. Both the two men were illegal immigrants from Bangladesh and had worked here prior to the murder.

By June 1988, the murder of Mohamed Shafiqul Islam was one of the 15 murder cases to occur during the first half of the year. In January 1989, the murder of Mohamed Shafiqul was cited as the only murder case where police were able to solve without any physical evidence, and the case was among the 81% of murder cases cracked by the police during the year of 1988.

In July 1988, after a preliminary hearing, a district court ordered that both Mohamed Bachu and Mahmuduzzaman should stand trial for murdering Mohamed Shafiqul on a later date to be decided.

== Murder trial and sentencing ==
Mohamed Bachu Miah, who was responsible for battering Mohamed Shafiqul to death and chopping off Mohamed Shafiqul's genitals.

Mohamed Mahmuduzzaman Khan, who helped to strangle Mohamed Shafiqul.

On 4 March 1991, three years after their arrest, both Mohamed Bachu Miah and Mohamed Mahmuduzzaman Khan were brought to trial for the murder of Mohamed Shafiqul Islam back in 1988. Standing trial at the High Court before two trial judges (Judicial Commissioner M P H Rubin and Justice T. S. Sinnathuray), Mahmuduzzaman and Mohamed Bachu, who were both represented by counsel in court, were prosecuted by Deputy Public Prosecutor Yang Ing Loong.

The trial court was told that, based on the men's confessions, both Mohamed Bachu and Mahmuduzzaman had conspired with one another to murder Mohamed Shafiqul. Reason being, at least one month before the murder itself, Mohamed Bachu's younger brother was arrested alongside many other people for working illegally in Singapore, and it was also apparent that Mohamed Shafiqul, himself also an illegal worker, acted as an informant to the immigration authorities to assist them in arresting the illegal foreign workers. Due to this, Mohamed Bachu harboured a great sense of hatred towards Mohamed Shafiqul for having snitched on his younger brother and other fellow Bangladeshi nationals, and thus in December 1987, a month before the murder, Mohamed Bachu and Mahmuduzzaman collaborated with one another to murder Mohamed Shafiqul. Mohamed Bachu even proposed to three other compatriots at one point to help him kill Mohamed Shafiqul, and the payment would be S$1,000 for the job. One of the two defendants even told his two colleagues that he wanted to kill Mohamed Shafiqul.

On the eve of the murder, Mohamed Bachu and Mahmuduzzaman took a taxi to look for Mohamed Shafiqul after they met up at Bukit Timah, and they met Mohamed Shafiqul at his workplace in Jalan Kampong Chantek off Dunearn Road. Mohamed Shafiqul, Mahmuduzzaman and Mohamed Bachu went out together to Jalan Kayu to collect money from some Thai workers, and along the way back, the trio consumed several bottles of stout and beer, and went to Circuit Road to look for a prostitute. The trio subsequently engaged the services of a 56-year-old woman, who had sex with all the three men, and according to the prostitute, she testified that the three men appeared to be friendly with one another and Mohamed Shafiqul had paid her S$25. Thereafter, the trio returned to Mohamed Shafiqul's workplace, where Mahmuduzzaman first attacked the victim by sitting on his chest and strangling him, but Mohamed Shafiqul put up a fierce resistance and bit Mahmuduzzaman's fingers. In order to help Mahmuduzzaman, Mohamed Bachu wielded a crank handle and battered Mohamed Shafiqul on the head several times, resulting in the victim's death. Additionally, to make sure that Mohamed Shafiqul had indeed died, both Mohamed Bachu and Mahmuduzzaman tried using their hands to remove his genitals, but they were unable to, and so Mohamed Bachu used the pliers to dismember the genitals from Mohamed Shafiqul's corpse instead. The above were hence the details of the prosecution's case based on the statements of the pair.

However, both Mahmuduzzaman and Mohamed Bachu denied that their statements were made accurately or voluntarily to Inspector Yeoh Bak Sek, and a trial within a trial was therefore conducted to verify the voluntariness of the statements. After the hearing, the trial judges ruled that the confessions were made voluntarily and they were admissible as evidence. In spite of this setback, the two men elected to put up their defence and stated that after they went out together for drinks and pimping, the two accused and the victim got into a drunken brawl and it unexpectedly caused the death of Mohamed Shafiqul, and there was no premeditation or conspiracy to actually kill Mohamed Shafiqul, and the defence counsel representing both men argued that their clients should be convicted of a lesser offence of manslaughter, which was not punishable by death but warranted life imprisonment as the maximum penalty.

In rebuttal, the prosecution argued that based on the autopsy report of Dr Clarence Tan, the brutality of the attack had caused Mohamed Shafiqul's death by both a broken neck and skull, and there was clearly severe force inflicted during the assault, and the evidence showed that the murder was done in cold blood and out of vengeance, given that Mohamed Bachu and Mahmuduzzaman were angered at Mohamed Shafiqul for his role as an informant that caused many of their compatriots, especially Mohamed Bachu's brother, to be deported from Singapore for illegal immigration. And therefore, the prosecution sought a guilty verdict of murder for both men.

On 27 March 1991, after a trial lasting 18 days, Justice T. S. Sinnathuray and Judicial Commissioner M P H Rubin delivered their verdict. In the judgement, the two trial judges found that the prosecution had proven the murder charge against both accused beyond a reasonable doubt, and they accepted that the two men had indeed conspired to cause the death of Mohamed Shafiqul due to the victim's direct responsibility behind the arrest of Mohamed Bachu's brother and his role as an informant, and also rejected the defence's accounts of the murder. Therefore, 32-year-old Mohamed Bachu Miah and 26-year-old Mohamed Mahmuduzzaman Khan were both found guilty of murder and condemned to death by hanging. At that time, Singaporean law mandated the death penalty for murder, and judges in Singapore had no discretion to opt for any other punishments aside from death.

== Appeals ==
On 11 September 1992, the Court of Appeal's three judges - Chief Justice Yong Pung How, and two Judges of Appeal L P Thean (Thean Lip Ping) and Chao Hick Tin - rejected the appeals of Mohamed Mahmuduzzaman Khan and Mohamed Bachu Miah. Both the appellants earlier argued that there was no intention or conspiracy to commit murder, and per Mohamed Bachu's case, he was drunk and therefore fought with each other, and thus caused Mohamed Shafiqul to die, while Mahmuduzzaman claimed he only tried to break up the fight between Mohamed Bachu and Mohamed Shafiqul. Also, the defence counsels of the duo again argued that the confessions were inadmissible on the grounds that the translator did not do a good job and it was not legally obtained. The three judges however, found that there was no error made in recording the police statements and it was legally done, and that the pair were able to converse smoothly in English. Plus, the three judges pointed out that based on the statements, it was clear that there was a motive and conspiracy between both appellants to kill Mohamed Shafiqul. The Court of Appeal therefore dismissed the appeals of Mohamed Bachu and Mahmuduzzaman, and in turn confirmed the death penalty for both the appellants, who remained on death row at Changi Prison awaiting their executions.

Meanwhile, human rights group Amnesty International caught attention of the case, and in March 1993, the group made a plea to the Singapore government to commute the death sentences of Mohamed Bachu and Mahmuduzzaman to life imprisonment.

As a final recourse to evade the gallows, Mahmuduzzaman made a final death row plea for presidential clemency, and if successful, Mahmuduzzaman's death sentence would be commuted to life imprisonment. Inside the plea, Mahmuduzzaman included a letter from Mohamed Bachu, who affirmed that he was solely responsible for the murder and not Mahmuduzzaman. The petition was, in the end, rejected by then President Wee Kim Wee and Mahmuduzzaman's death sentence was therefore finalized. It was unknown if Mohamed Bachu had appealed for clemency like Mahmuduzzaman did.

== Double execution ==
Mohamed Bachu Miah and Mohamed Mahmuduzzaman Khan were both hanged in Changi Prison on 23 July 1993. Four days later, Amnesty International confirmed that the double executions were carried out as scheduled in the duo's death warrants.

In a 1994 report, Amnesty International revealed that there were minimally 26 death sentences - three for murder and 23 for drug trafficking - imposed by the courts and at least five, including Mahmuduzzaman and Mohamed Bachu, were put to death in Singapore, and critical of the use of both caning and capital punishment and the restriction orders of former prisoners of conscience like Chia Thye Poh and Vincent Cheng Kim Chuan, Amnesty International urged the Singapore government to abolish both caning and the death penalty, and commute all the remaining death sentences to life imprisonment, as well as lifting the restriction orders imposed on the former prisoners of conscience. Both Chia and Cheng were detained indefinitely for suspected communist activities in 1966 and 1987 respectively under the Internal Security Act, and the restrictions on both men were eventually lifted by the end of November 1998.

Official prison statistics in Singapore revealed a total of seven people were executed in Singapore during the year 1993. Out of these seven convicts, five people, including Mohamed Bachu, Mahmuduzzaman and a cleaner named Maksa bin Tohaiee, were hanged for murder; Maksa was hanged on 26 November 1993 for robbing and murdering an Italian housewife back in October 1990, while the remaining two, identified as Hongkongers Raymond Ko Mun Cheung and Chiu Sum Hing, were hanged for drug trafficking.

== See also ==
- Capital punishment in Singapore
