= Murder of Ong Ai Siok =

1980 murder of a schoolgirl in Singapore

Ong Ai Siok
- Ong Ai Siok, the 16-year-old schoolgirl found murdered at her home
- Born: Goh Luan Kheng; 1964; Singapore, Malaysia
- Died: 25 July 1980 (aged 16); Pipit Road, Singapore
- Cause of death: Murdered
- Other names: Goh Wan Kheng
- Education: Secondary Two at Upper Aljunied Technical School (incomplete due to her death)
- Occupation: Student
- Known for: Murder victim
- Parent(s): Ong Hong Boon (adoptive father); Tan Ah Eng (adoptive mother); Mr. Goh and Mrs. Goh (birth parents)

On 25 July 1980, 16-year-old student Ong Ai Siok (王爱素 Wáng Aìsù), birth name Goh Luan Kheng (吴鸾琼 Wú Luánqióng), who stayed at home to study overnight while her adoptive parents went out for supper, was murdered by her unemployed relative Lau Ah Kiang (刘亚强 Líu Yàqiáng), who entered her home to commit robbery as a result of his desperation to discharge his debts and settle his unpaid living expenses. Six years after his arrest, Lau, who denied committing the murder despite his confession, was sentenced to death in February 1986 after the trial court found him guilty of murder.

== Murder investigation ==
On the early morning of 25 July 1980, at about 2am, a teenage girl was found dead inside her Pipit Road flat after her parents and her four-year-old niece Ong Hwee Leng (王惠玲 Wáng Huìlíng) returned home.

The victim was Ong Ai Siok, who was 16 years old and was a second-year student of Upper Aljunied Technical School. Ong was said to have stayed at home to study for her exam the following day after she declined to go out with her parents and niece to eat supper, and she was last seen alive one hour before her murder. Ong, whose birth name was Goh Luan Kheng (or Goh Wan Kheng), was adopted by her parents, who had one elder son and elder daughter, who were both married.

According to her 52-year-old adoptive mother Tan Ah Eng (陈亚英 Chén Yàyīng), Ong was a well-mannered and kind daughter. Her 56-year-old adoptive father Ong Hong Boon (王奉文 Wáng Fèngwén), who worked as a bus conductor, adopted her a few days after her birth, and her biological father was a friend of Ong Hong Boon. Ong's 28-year-old sister Kwek Poh Lang (郭宝兰 Guō Bǎolán), who was also adopted, described her as an average but hard-working student. Upon hearing about Ong's death, Ong's classmates were saddened about the loss of their friend, who was known to be quiet, sociable and pleasant. One of them, 16-year-old Lim Lay Wah, however stated that Ong recently became withdrawn and became occupied with worry. Another student, 16-year-old Koh Lay Wah, also noted that Ong expressed her depressed feelings and how she was fed up with things.

The police deduced that the crime was committed by someone known to the victim since there was no signs of forced entry into the flat. A chopper was missing from the kitchen but nothing else was missing despite the flat being ransacked by an unknown person. There were knife wounds found on the victim's neck and arms, consistent with someone using a chopper to attack the girl and killing her.

On 28 July 1980, a 25-year-old suspect was arrested after he was brought into questioning for the alleged murder of Ong. The suspect Lau Ah Kiang (alias Sunny or Ah Hua), who was Ong's adoptive relative, was charged the next day with murder. Lau's remand was extended in August 1980 after the case was adjourned to that month itself.

== Lau Ah Kiang's confession ==
Lau Ah Kiang, a distant relative of Ong's adoptive parents

After his arrest, Lau, who was unemployed and married with a daughter, confessed that he killed Ong Ai Siok due to his need to steal money from her home, where he often frequented to play mahjong with Ong's adoptive parents prior to the murder.

Lau admitted to the police that he had been facing difficulty in covering up his family's water and electricity fees, and the instalment payments for both his flat (he lived two doors away in the same block as the Ong family) and new refrigerator. In addition Lau also lost money during gambling and owed money to debtors. Therefore, he decided to go to Ong's house to commit robbery, and pretended to look for Ong, which made her allowing Lau to enter her flat. At that time, Ong was alone at home studying for her exam and her parents and niece had left the flat for supper.

After entering the flat, Lau picked up the chopper and threatened Ong on knifepoint, demanding that Ong to not make a sound. Ong however, shrieked out of fear and fiercely resisted, and therefore, Lau used the chopper to inflict at least five blows on her neck, and hence killing Ong. After which, Lau went to pry open the drawers where he saw Ong's adoptive parents kept the money, but he failed to get the cash, and hence he was forced to leave the flat through the back window and even disposed of the chopper after cleaning it.

Lau recounted that he therefore returned to his flat and stayed there until he heard a neighbor coming to inform him that Ong was found dead in her home, and he came down to pretend to offer help and condolences to the victim's family.

== Trial and sentencing ==
On 17 February 1986, after spending six years in remand, Lau Ah Kiang was finally brought to trial at the High Court for the charge of murder in relation to the death of 16-year-old Ong Ai Siok. Lau was represented by Tommy Neo during the trial, while the prosecution was led by Lawrence Ang. Two trial judges - T S Sinnathuray and Abdul Wahab Ghows - were appointed to hear the case.

Several witnesses, including Ong's adoptive mother Tan Ah Eng, came to court to testify for the prosecution. She testified that after she and her husband discovered Ong dead inside the bedroom, Lau was one of the many relatives and residents to arrive outside their flat and offered both help and condolences to the family. Lau had earlier stated in his confession that he went there to put up a facade that he was innocent of the crime.

Another witness was 20-year-old Chia Boon Hwee. He testified that on the night of the murder, he and his four friends were downstairs gambling when he happened to witness the defendant Lau walking up and down the stairs, just before Ong was found murdered inside her bedroom. Chia stated that he remembered seeing a tattoo on one of the thighs of Lau, and it was how he recognized Lau as the person with the leg tattoo who broke into the Ong family's flat. Dr Wee Keng Poh, the forensic pathologist who examined the corpse of Ong, stated that he found a total of at least five knife wounds on Ong's neck, which were likely caused by stabbing and slashing, and they were inflicted with considerable force. Dr Wee also stated that each of these wounds were fatal by individual nature and either one of them would have caused Ong to die.

However, on the stand, Lau deviated from his confession, and he denied that he confessed voluntarily to the police that he killed Ong. Instead, he accused the investigating officer, Assistant Superintendent of Police (ASP) Leong Kong Hong (梁广雄 Liáng Guǎngxióng) for using a gun to threaten him, assault him physically and forcing him to sign the statements after ASP Leong made up the whole story of him getting into the flat to kill Ong and commit burglary. Subsequently, the allegations raised by Lau were overruled and the confession was admitted as evidence.

Despite so, Lau continued to deny killing Ong and maintained his innocence. He raised an alibi defence that he had been at home watching television before he heard Tan's screams for help and a neighbor informing him that Ong had died. Dr Wong Yip Chong, a private psychiatrist, was originally called by the defence to testify and support Lai's second defence of diminished responsibility. However, upon appearing in court, Dr Wong applied to withdraw as a witness as he told the court that during his examination of Lau, Lau continually denied killing Ong despite Wong's need to certify if he was mentally sound when killing the teenager. The court granted Wong's application, and reserved their judgement until 21 February 1986 after receiving the closing submissions from both the prosecution and defence.

On 21 February 1986, 31-year-old Lau Ah Kiang was found guilty of murder and sentenced to death. The trial judges, Justice Abdul Wahab Ghows and Justice T S Sinnathuray, were satisfied beyond a reasonable doubt that Lau had been there at the scene of crime and intentionally inflicted "savage wounds" on Ong to cause her death, and accepted that Lau had confessed voluntarily and that he indeed murdered Ong in cold blood during the failed robbery attempt. Therefore, they convicted Lau of murder and imposed the death penalty (the mandatory punishment for murder) on him.

== Aftermath ==
On 18 January 1988, nearly two years after his trial, Lau Ah Kiang appealed both his murder conviction and death sentence, continuing to claim that his police statements should not be admitted as evidence due to them not being made voluntarily and he maintained that he had an alibi and was not at the scene of crime when Ong Ai Siok was killed. The appeal however, was dismissed by the Court of Appeal, after the three judges - Chief Justice Wee Chong Jin, Justice Lai Kew Chai and Judicial Commissioner Chan Sek Keong - upheld that Lau indeed voluntarily made the confession and killed the teenage girl. Lau was eventually hanged after losing his appeal.

In November 1988, the Black Museum at the Police Academy first opened, and it displayed the photographs of some of the brutal homicide cases which police came across over the past decades, and these photographs included the ones taken at the crime scene of the Ong Ai Siok murder case.

== See also ==
- Capital punishment in Singapore
