= Murder of Arumugam Jayamani =

1972 case of a gang-related murder in Singapore

Arumugam Jayamani
- Born: Arumugam Jayamani; 1951; Colony of Singapore
- Died: 16 October 1972 (aged 21); Enggor Street, Tanjong Pagar, Singapore
- Cause of death: Stabbed
- Other names: Beatles Rajah; A. Jayamani
- Occupation: Unemployed
- Known for: Murder victim

On 16 October 1972, Arumugam Jayamani was attacked and fatally stabbed by Chelliah Silvanathan outside a sarabat stall in Enggor Street, Tanjong Pagar. The murder was motivated by a supposed gambling affair; both parties belonged to the same gang. Chelliah was found guilty of murdering Arumugam and sentenced to hang on 21 September 1973. After losing his appeals against the sentence and conviction, he was executed on 11 April 1975.

== Stabbing at Enggor Street ==
On the night of 16 October 1972, in front of a backlane sabarat stall at Enggor Road, Tanjong Pagar, a man was stabbed by another person and died. Identified as 21-year-old Arumugam Jayamani, the victim was found to have suffered stab wounds, and the detectives could not find the murder weapon from nearby the scene of crime; while the motive of the murder was yet to be established, the police interviewed several people around the area for witnesses. An autopsy report revealed that Arumugam was stabbed twice, once on the chest and another on the back, and the knife wound to the chest had penetrated his heart and this resulted in Arumugam's death.

On 14 November 1972, a 21-year-old suspect was arrested for killing Arumugam a month before. The suspect, identified as Chelliah Silvanathan, was charged with murder the next day. Both Chelliah and Arumugam belonged to the same gang, known as Hai Lok San.

== Trial of Chelliah Silvanathan ==
In September 1973, Chelliah Silvanathan stood trial at the High Court for the murder of Arumugam Jayamani. During the trial, which was presided by Justice T Kulasekaram and Justice A V Winslow, Chelliah was represented by criminal lawyer Subhas Anandan, while the trial prosecutor was Lawrence Ang, who was coincidentally Anandan's former law school classmate and friend.

The trial court heard that prior to the stabbing, Arumugam and Chelliah had an argument over a gambling affair, and this led to Chelliah going after Arumugam with a knife and stabbing him to death in front of the sabarat stall, where Arumugam was having a meal at the time he was attacked. Though there were no direct witnesses to the stabbing, the sabarat stallholder Yusof Maideen testified that he heard no commotion happening in front of his stall and only heard Arumugam crying for help as he was preparing some drinks, and witnessed Arumugam clutching his injury and staggered before he collapsed. Haridass Kutan Pillai, a friend of Chelliah, also testified in court that Chelliah had confessed to stabbing Arumugam to death when he met him the night after the stabbing.

In court, Chelliah gave a defence that he never meant to kill Arumugam. He testified that after he heard Arumugam saying he would go after him over the past quarrel, Chelliah decided to go to the stall at Enggor Street to apologize to Arumugam, and only brought the knife just in case for the sake of self-defence, if Arumugam still did not accept his apology and assault him. Chelliah also said he wanted to use the knife to cause only minor hurt but nothing else. Chelliah added that when Arumugam caught sight of Chelliah, he wanted to raise a bottle to hit Chelliah and thus, Chelliah stabbed him to stop him from wielding the bottle, and he stabbed Arumugam after the victim tried to use a wooden stool to attack him, and he fled after the victim was stabbed a second time.

On 21 September 1973, the verdict was delivered by Justice Kulasekaram and Justice Winslow, the latter who pronounced the decision in court. In the verdict, the judges found that Chelliah had the intent to murder Arumugam when he stabbed him, and they also rejected his defence that he only went there to apologize with Arumugam and brought the knife along for the purpose of causing minor harm, and the two judges felt that Chelliah's decision to bring the knife was corroborative of the fact that he had intended to cause Arumugam's death, and it was not for self-defence like Chelliah claimed. Therefore, 21-year-old Chelliah Silvanathan was found guilty of murder and sentenced to death. Chelliah was reportedly calm when the sentence was passed, but his father was devastated after hearing the verdict and reportedly knelt down in front of his son's lawyer in court and pleaded to see his son.

As of 4 February 1974, Chelliah was one of the 17 prisoners on death row awaiting their executions, and by 5 October 1974, the number was reduced to 15, with Chelliah included in the list of death row prisoners released that month.

== Appeal processes ==
On 25 March 1974, Chelliah's appeal was heard in the Court of Appeal before three judges - Chief Justice Wee Chong Jin, Justice Tan Ah Tah and Justice F A Chua (Frederick Arthur Chua). Without calling for the prosecution's reply, the three judges dismissed Chelliah's appeal and rejected Anandan's arguments. Like the trial judges, the appellate court agreed that Chelliah possessed the clear intention to cause death, or at least any bodily injury(s) that was sufficient in the ordinary course of nature to cause death when he fatally stabbed Arumugam.

On 16 January 1975, Chelliah applied for special leave to appeal to the Privy Council in London for a review of his case. However, the Privy Council refused to grant Chelliah's motion and hence Chelliah lost his final court bid to escape the gallows.

Subsequently, Anandan filed for presidential clemency on behalf of Chelliah, seeking to have Chelliah's death sentence commuted to life imprisonment. However, then President Benjamin Sheares declined to pardon Chelliah, and hence turned down Chelliah's clemency appeal, which thus finalized Chelliah's death sentence and he was set to hang in a week's time.

== Execution ==
On 11 April 1975, 23-year-old Chelliah Silvanathan was hanged in Changi Prison at dawn. Chelliah was cremated at the Hindu Crematorium on the same date of his execution.

More than three decades after Chelliah was put to death, his former lawyer Subhas Anandan recorded his case inside his 2009 book The Best I Could. Addressing Chelliah by his nickname “Tampines Rajah” (which Anandan spelt as Tampines Raja), Anandan wrote about his experiences of defending Chelliah (who was Anandan's acquaintance), stating that he was saddened at the verdict of death and had gotten drunk that same night after the trial, and he also wrote that during his incarceration on death row, Chelliah, who was born a Hindu, converted himself to Christianity and expressed remorse for killing Arumugam (whom Anandan also addressed by his nickname as well) and that he was grateful to Anandan for defending him. He encouraged Anandan to continue defending other people and be a dedicated and good lawyer during Anandan's final visit to prison before Chelliah was executed.

Chelliah's case was Anandan's first murder case during his early years as a lawyer, and although he lost the case and it ended with Chelliah hanged for the murder, it made an impact on his legal career as Anandan would manage over 1,500 criminal cases (including murder, rape and drug trafficking) through his 45-year-long legal career, until he died from a heart attack in January 2015, and Anandan became renowned for his representation of suspects charged in high-profile murder cases, including infamous wife-killer Anthony Ler, Kallang body-parts murderer Leong Siew Chor, schizophrenic child-killer Constance Chee Cheong Hin, Oriental Hotel killer Abdul Nasir Amer Hamsah, notorious gunman Tan Chor Jin, and child-killer Took Leng How.

== See also ==
- Capital punishment in Singapore
- List of major crimes in Singapore
