= Ang Mo Kio massage parlour murder =

2006 murder of a massage parlour owner in Singapore

Yu Hongjin
- Born: Yu Hongjin; 1977; Fujian, People's Republic of China
- Died: 18 June 2006 (aged 29); Ang Mo Kio, Singapore
- Cause of death: Murdered
- Other name: Xiao Hong
- Occupation: Massage parlour owner (former)
- Known for: Murder victim
- Children: 1 son

On 18 June 2006, 52-year-old Eu Lim Hoklai (Chinese: 余林福来; Pe̍h-ōe-jī: Îr Lîm Hok-lâi; pinyin: Yú Lín Fúlái), the owner of a seafood hawker stall, fatally stabbed 29-year-old Yu Hongjin (Chinese: 俞洪金; Pe̍h-ōe-jī: Îr Âng-kim; pinyin: Yú Hóngjīn), a massage parlour owner and peidu mama from China, while they were arguing with each other and Yu having knifed him on the stomach nine times. It was revealed that Eu, a married father of three, had an affair with Yu after his first few massage sessions at Yu's shop, and after discovering that Yu had been seeing someone else, Eu decided to see her on the day of the murder to break up with her, but it sparked into a fight that ended Yu's life.

Eu was charged with murder while he was hospitalized for the injuries he sustained. The prosecution argued that Eu had murdered Yu in cold blood and his injuries were self-inflicted, while the defence argued that the killing was a result of a fight and the stab wounds of Eu were inflicted by Yu. Although Eu's defence was rejected and he was sentenced to death for murder by the trial court, he was successful in his appeal and Eu was therefore re-sentenced to ten years' imprisonment for a reduced charge of manslaughter.

== Murder ==
=== Stabbing incident ===
On the Sunday morning of 18 June 2006, which coincided with Father's Day, while she was at home in her family's flat, 25-year-old Eu Sui Lin received a phone call from her 52-year-old father, who asked her to come help him, stating that he was hurt. After receiving the phone call, Eu Sui Lin, her youngest sister and their mother Ng Mooi Huang rushed to a massage parlour in Ang Mo Kio, where they found her father Eu Lim Hoklai lying unconscious on his back, with several stab wounds on his abdomen. Inside a cubicle of the parlour, a woman was found dead with a knife clutched onto her hand. The police also arrived at the scene around the same time as Eu's children and wife, and later, the woman was pronounced dead by paramedics who arrived at the scene, and Eu himself was rushed to hospital, where he survived with medical treatment.

The victim was identified as 29-year-old Yu Hongjin, a Chinese citizen who was a divorcee with one son. A native of Fuqing, Fujian, Yu and her son first came to Singapore in 2002 to ensure her son be educated in Singapore, and Yu, who became a peidu mama, stayed to take care of her son while she operated a massage parlour to make ends meet, even though as a peidu mama, she was not allowed to work per the immigration regulations of Singapore. It was certified first-hand that her death was likely due to strangulation and stabbing.

Yu's funeral was carried out weeks after her murder, with her ten-year-old son, ex-husband, brother and sister-in-law being the only ones present at her wake. Also, due to Yu's case, a police crackdown on massage parlours was conducted, leading to the arrest of some foreigners who illegally operated these parlours or employed foreigners for work. Some peidu mamas were also arrested during the crackdown itself.

=== Arrest and charges ===
While he was hospitalized at the intensive care unit of Tan Tock Seng Hospital for his injuries, Eu Lim Hoklai, who celebrated his 53rd birthday three days after the stabbing incident, was officially placed under arrest and charged with murder. When the charge sheet was presented to Eu in his ward, he was reportedly accompanied by a Hokkien-English translator and his lawyer Subhas Anandan, a leading criminal lawyer who agreed to represent Eu after the suspect's family sought his services.

During his questioning by the police while in hospital, Eu's 42-year-old youngest brother Eu Hock Chye and other family members were not allowed to accompany him, and Eu's brother was reportedly heartbroken and both he and Eu cried together due to the imminent possibility that Eu would be sentenced to hang for murder (which was punishable by death in Singapore). Eu's youngest brother also said his brother was a kind and generous man and would not cause trouble. Eu later recovered from his injuries, and he was placed under psychiatric remand while pending police investigations and trial. In May 2007, Eu was ordered to stand trial on a later date for the murder of Yu Hongjin.

Background information also revealed that Eu and his wife operated a popular seafood tze char hawker stall at a food centre in Tampines since 1984 and they were married for 28 years as of the time Eu was arrested for killing Yu. Eu and his wife were married with three daughters, and the eldest was married and living separately from her parents. His daughters described him as a gentle and kind man and also a loving and caring father who never raised his voice or laid a hand on them, even when he reprimanded them for whichever wrongdoing. Eu, who only spoke Hokkien but not English, only studied up to Primary Three before he dropped out, and he had at least three siblings in his family.

== Trial of Eu Lim Hoklai ==
=== Eu's account ===
Eu Lim Hoklai
- Born: Eu Lim Hoklai; 21 June 1953 (age 73); Colony of Singapore
- Other name: Ah Wang
- Occupation: Seafood hawker
- Spouse: Ng Mooi Huang (m. 1978)
- Children: Three daughters
- Parent: Unnamed mother
- Status: Released
- Motive: Self-defence
- Conviction: Manslaughter (one count)
- Criminal charges: Murder (one count)
- Penalty: Death, later commuted to ten years' imprisonment (2011)

On 21 January 2008, the trial of Eu Lim Hoklai began at the High Court, with Singapore's top criminal lawyer Subhas Anandan and his nephew Sunil Sudheesan representing Eu, while the prosecution was led by Deputy Public Prosecutor (DPP) Winston Cheng. The trial was presided by Justice Kan Ting Chiu.

The trial court was told that starting from March 2005, Eu had an affair with the victim Yu Hongjin, who first met him at a massage parlour in Ang Mo Kio, and after going there for massage a few times, Eu and Yu began their relationship, unbeknownst to Eu's wife and three daughters, and eventually, when Yu opened her own massage parlour, Eu forked out some of his money to help her open the shop. He sometimes would also use a part of his seafood stall's revenue to pay for Yu's living expenses. However, on 14 June 2006, the relationship between Yu and Eu had gone sour, after Eu found out that Yu was seeing other men, and therefore, he formed an intention to break up with Yu and completely cut off his ties with her. Throughout the next three days before Yu was killed, Eu and Yu quarrelled each time they met.

On 18 June 2006, also Father's Day, Eu was at home and planned to go out to meet Yu when his daughters told him they want to bring him out later for a dim sum lunch to celebrate Father's Day. Eu later told his daughters that he would be going to the seafood stall to sort out the fish, as an excuse to go out and settle his matters with Yu, and also declined his daughters' request to go out with him. After reaching Yu's massage parlour in Ang Mo Kio, Eu told her that he wanted to end their relationship, but the discussion did not go well as Yu tried to extort S$30,000 from Eu as a "separation fee" to completely cut off contact with Eu, and Yu even threatened to tell Eu's family that she would expose their secret if he refused to pay up on time. This discussion escalated into an argument between Yu and Eu as Eu refused to comply with Yu's demand, and insisted on making his urgent leave due to his family's plan to celebrate Father's Day.

According to Eu, Yu grabbed a kitchen knife from her shop and stabbed Eu on the abdomen several times, and in self-defense, Eu strangled Yu during the stabbing and also purportedly stabbed Yu as well, and Eu, who continued to clutch his hand onto Yu's neck, called his second daughter for help before he fainted and lost consciousness, but was still alive by the time two of his daughters, his wife and the police arrived at the parlour to help him. A neighbouring shop owner, Wong Choon Mee, testified that she likely heard the sounds of a struggle coming out from Yu's massage parlour.

=== Prosecution's forensic evidence ===
The prosecution's case was that Eu had committed the murder in cold blood, arguing that Eu had lied about being stabbed by Yu, and stated that it was Eu who first stabbed Yu before he stabbed himself on the abdomen to stage it as a killing due to a sudden fight.

Dr Paul Chui, a senior forensic pathologist, stated that he had examined the injuries of Eu while Eu was in custody for killing Yu, and he told the court that Eu was extremely lucky, because the nine stab wounds found on him were so deep that at least three of them would have penetrated Eu's organs and cause his potential death had it not missed the organs. Dr Chui's colleague Dr Wee Keng Poh, the forensic pathologist who performed an autopsy on Yu, also took the stand to present his autopsy findings; Dr Wee identified that there were two fatal knife wounds which penetrated her liver and kidney, and this resulted in her death, and the strangulation also partially contributed to Yu's death. However, both Dr Chui and Dr Wee were unable to conclude whether the wounds on Eu were self-inflicted or caused by Yu before her death.

Dr Lim Chin Chin, a forensic scientist, also gave her analysis of the crime scene. She stated that it was more probable to conclude that the wounds on Eu's abdomen were self-inflicted, and pointed out that Eu's shirt was not damaged and stated Eu must have lifted the shirt and stabbed himself with the knife after murdering Yu Hongjin. It was noted by the experts that the crime scene itself was relatively clean and little to no bloodstains were found at the parlour, and bore few signs of a struggle.

=== Defence's forensic evidence ===
The defence however, persevered in their case, urging the trial court to accept that Eu had been stabbed by Yu and Eu had therefore stabbed Yu and strangled her in the moment of self-defense, and it was not a premeditated murder as what the prosecution sought to prove. Anandan reportedly expressed his concern with the accuracy of news reports during the trial, when it was erroneously reported at one point that Justice Kan found Eu's self-defence claims "hard to believe".

To counter the prosecution, Anandan engaged an Australian forensic scientist, Dr Johan Duflou, to impeach Dr Lim's testimony. Dr Duflou, who flew over from Australia to Singapore to testify in Eu's trial, explained that Dr Lim was wrong to conclude that Eu's wounds were self-inflicted, and it was more likely that Yu had stabbed Eu. Dr Duflou testified that scientifically, self-inflicted wounds are noted to be tightly concentrated within a region of the body, and yet Eu's wounds were inflicted all over his abdomen, and secondly, self-inflicted wounds are superficial and would not be at the risk of harming one's vital part of the body, and yet Eu's wounds were extremely deep and some of which even narrowly missed his organs, and third of all, a person who had self-inflicted wounds would prefer to cut himself on the hands or neck and they were normally incisions rather than stab wounds, but Eu's wounds were caused by stabbing and inflicted on the abdomen, and basically, there was no hesitation marks on the wounds themselves. These above traits debunked the prosecution's theory that Eu's wounds were self-inflicted. Dr Duflou also explained why Eu's shirt was not damaged, because it was possible that Yu had lifted Eu's shirt to stab her former lover as what Eu claimed, and Dr Duflou told the court that the lack of bloodstains at the crime scene was possibly because of the struggle taking place within the extremely small space of the cubicle within Yu's massage parlour and it was likely that Yu sustained internal bleeding and it could not be concluded that she was lying on her back when Eu stabbed her, pointing out that no blood were observed to have flown out of Yu's stab wounds at the time she was found dead.

Aside from this, Eu, who took the stand to testify, was also asked to re-enact in court how he killed Yu on that fateful morning.

=== Verdict ===
On 30 June 2009, Justice Kan Ting Chiu delivered his verdict.

In the judgement, Justice Kan did not touch on the question of whether the wounds on Eu were caused by Yu or self-inflicted, but he stated that the inconsistencies between Eu's account and the objective evidence, and he therefore rejected Eu's defence of sudden fight or self-defense, and also accepted the testimony of Wong that a struggle likely took place from Yu's shop, and he also found that Eu had intentionally inflicted the knife injuries on Yu, such that the wounds caused were sufficient in the ordinary course of nature to cause death. Therefore, Justice Kan found 56-year-old Eu Lim Hoklai guilty of murdering Yu Hong Jin, and sentenced him to death. Under Singaporean law, the death penalty was the mandatory sentence for murder. Eu's family were reportedly distraught to hear the judgement, and Eu himself waved at his family to reassure them, and expressed his intention to appeal.

== Eu's appeal ==
In September 2010, Eu Lim Hoklai's appeal was heard before the Court of Appeal. The main crux of the appeal was about whether Eu's abdominal wounds were inflicted by the victim Yu Hongjin or self-inflicted, and whether the murder itself arose from a sudden fight or committed out of cold blood; the defence counsel also argued that the judge had failed to adequately consider the main question of how Eu's wounds came about and placed undue reliance on the witness's statement of hearing a struggle breaking out from Yu's massage parlour.

On 12 April 2011, the Court of Appeal's three-judge panel, consisting of Chief Justice Chan Sek Keong, and two Judges of Appeal Andrew Phang and V. K. Rajah, delivered their judgement, with Justice Rajah pronouncing the verdict in court. In their verdict, Justice Rajah said that they disagreed with the trial judge Kan Ting Chiu's decision, finding that he did not adequately consider the question of whether the wounds on Eu wee self-inflicted or caused by Yu, and he had placed undue reliance on Wong Choon Mee's testimony when it was unclear whether she was present at her shop at the time of the killing, and they also found Justice Kan's reasons to convict Eu of murder were not clear enough. Justice Rajah also cited that the prosecution's case was weak and full of "worrying gaps" and therefore harshly reprimanded the prosecutors for not satisfactorily establishing their case of a cold-hearted murder against Eu.

Justice Rajah also stated the panel were critical of the credibility of Dr Lim Chin Chin's testimony, because they felt that Dr Lim did not have an objective opinion when making her analysis of the crime scene and incorporated her personal views into the parts where it was outside of her expertise, and she did not adequately consider the other theories of Yu stabbing Eu aside from the theory of self-inflicted injuries. In contrast, the Court of Appeal were more inclined to accept Dr Johan Duflou's testimony that Eu's wounds were more likely to be caused by Yu before her death, and decided that there was indeed a sudden fight between Yu and Eu and thus led to Yu's death, regardless of whoever was the aggressor, and therefore rejected the prosecution's claim that Yu's death was the result of a cold-blooded murder. They also taken into account that Eu was normally a non-violent person with a mild temper, and he never retaliate even if Yu had hit him on a few occasions, and also found it unlikely that Eu would want to go to Yu's workplace with a premeditated intent to commit murder when he was due home to celebrate Father's Day with his three daughters and family members.

In conclusion, Justice Rajah ruled on behalf of the three-judge panel that Eu was found not guilty of murder, and instead, the appellate court reduced the original charge of murder to a lesser crime of culpable homicide not amounting to murder, also known as manslaughter in Singaporean legal terms. They also overturned the death sentence, and ordered that the case be remitted to the High Court for re-sentencing. The crime of manslaughter was punishable by either a jail term of up to ten years, or life imprisonment.

Eu's 86-year-old mother, two elder sisters, a younger brother, his three daughters and ten of his close friends, who were present in court, reportedly cried in relief after hearing that Eu would no longer face the death penalty for murdering Yu Hongjin. Although Eu's wife was absent from court, his friends told the press that she had since forgave her husband and was willing to wait for his release and start a new life with him. Eu himself was also grateful for the reprieve and thanked his lawyers, and waved at his family.

== Eu's re-sentencing ==
On 27 May 2011, Eu Lim Hoklai's re-sentencing trial took place before the original trial judge Kan Ting Chiu at the High Court.

During Eu's re-sentencing trial, DPP Winston Cheng argued that Eu should be sentenced to life imprisonment on the grounds that Eu's conduct at the time of the stabbing was deplorable and a harsh sentence was warranted. However, Subhas Anandan rebutted DPP Cheng's claims by arguing that Eu deserved leniency and should be sentenced to ten years' imprisonment, since the killing was not premeditated and it was a result of a sudden fight, which even the Court of Appeal agreed with after debunking the prosecution's attempt to paint Eu as a cold-blooded killer.

On the same date, Justice Kan delivered his verdict, sentencing 57-year-old Eu Lim Hoklai to jail for ten years after he rejected the prosecution's request for a life term. Justice Kan stated that he accepted Anandan's mitigation plea that Yu was killed during an unpremeditated fight and also taken into consideration that Eu was a first-time offender, and hence he chose to err on the side of leniency and commit Eu to serve ten years in prison and not life. As Eu maintained good behavior while he was incarcerated both in remand and death row, Eu was eligible for parole after completing at least two-thirds of his jail term and since Eu's sentence was backdated to the date of his arrest in June 2006, he had about 21 months left before he could be released in February 2013. Eu was not given caning as he was above 50 years old at the time of sentencing.

Eu's 86-year-old mother was present in court at the time of her son's sentencing, and she shed tears of relief after hearing the verdict and thanked Anandan for defending her son. Eu's three daughters were similarly relieved to hear that their father was not given a life sentence, and they stated that they had forgiven him and professed their love for their father, and they anticipated Eu coming home in less than two years' time so that they could celebrate Father's Day with him again. As for Eu's wife, who was then alone managing the family's seafood stall, she told the press that after she first found out about the affair her husband used to have with Yu Hongjin, she had a hard time getting over the pain of her husband's betrayal, and it was also revealed that due to the publicity surrounding the case of her husband, Eu's wife had to endure the gawking eyes of some customers and passers-by who recognized her.

== Aftermath ==
In 2014, Eu Lim Hoklai's former lawyer Subhas Anandan's book The Best I Could was adapted into a two-season television series, which featured his former cases. The case of Yu Hongjin's murder and Eu's trial was featured as the second episode of the show's second season. The difference was, Eu Lim Hoklai's case was not featured in the book as his trial was still ongoing at the time when Anandan first published his book in 2009. Anandan, who was interviewed in the show, stated that he was disappointed with the original trial decision for not addressing adequately on whether the wounds on Eu were self-inflicted or caused by the victim, and it led to him filing an appeal and successfully argued for Eu to be convicted of manslaughter.

Liz Porter, a crime writer from Australia, included Eu Lim Hoklai's case in her 2017 real-life crime book Crime Scene Asia: When Forensic Evidence Becomes the Silent Witness. The book was about murder cases from Asia that were solved through forensic evidence; these recorded cases came from Asian countries like Singapore, Malaysia and Hong Kong. Dr Duflou, whose interview was featured in the book, said that when he was invited by Anandan as an expert witness to testify in Eu's defence, he was determined to give an objective testimony to help corroborate Eu's defence, especially since Eu was facing the death penalty for murder in Singapore, and he himself was also a staunch opponent of the death penalty, which Australia had abolished since 1985.

Eu had since been released from jail on parole in February 2013.

== See also ==
- Capital punishment in Singapore
- List of major crimes in Singapore
