= Lawrence Ang =

Singaporean lawyer

Lawrence Ang Boon Kong (Chinese: 洪文光; pinyin: Hóng Wénguāng) is a Singaporean lawyer who specialises in corporate offences and criminal law.

== Education ==
Lawrence Ang graduated from the National University of Singapore in 1970. In law school, he was classmates with Subhas Anandan, who later became a prominent criminal defence lawyer in Singapore.

== Career ==
During his early years as a prosecutor, Ang’s first murder case was the 1973 case of Chelliah Silvanathan, who was charged with the murder of a fellow gang member. Ang successfully prosecuted and persuaded the trial court to impose a death sentence on Chelliah, who was coincidentally represented by his ex-classmate and friend Subhas Anandan. Ang was also the trial prosecutor of the 1975 case of Nadarajah Govindasamy, a Hindu businessman who was charged with murdering his daughter’s Muslim fiancé. Ang urged the court to reject Nadarajah’s defense of sudden and grave provocation, stating that the defendant had murdered the victim Mohamed Azad Hussein in cold blood and had brutally and mercilessly hacked him with a chopper with a premeditated intent to cause death. Ang’s submissions were accepted by the trial judges, who sentenced Nadarajah to be executed for Mohamed Azad’s murder.

Ang was Director of the Commercial Affairs Department from 1991 to 1999. He replaced Glenn Knight after the latter came under investigation by the Corrupt Practices Investigation Bureau. He stepped down in October 1999 when the CAD was merged with the Commercial Crimes Division of the Singapore Police Force.

Before becoming CAD Director, Ang had assisted the Commission of Inquiry into the death of National Development Minister Teh Cheang Wan, who committed suicide in the midst of corruption investigations. He also was the Deputy Public Prosecutor in the trial of Francis Seow. In Seow's trial, lawyer V. K. Dube complained that Ang had misconducted himself by making remarks which were "unwarranted, baseless and untrue." The Law Society fined Ang S$1,000 but he appealed to the High Court, which waived the fine after deciding that the Law Society had no jurisdiction to discipline Ang because he did not have a practising certificate, even though he was an advocate and solicitor. On appeal to the Singapore Court of Appeal, the Court decided that because Ang was an advocate and solicitor, the jurisdiction of the Law Society did extend to him notwithstanding his lack of a practicing certificate: however, on the facts they did not uphold the fine.

During his time as CAD Director, Ang headed the prosecution for cases such as that of former Member of Parliament Choo Wee Khiang and Barings Bank trader Nick Leeson.

After stepping down, Ang continued to be Deputy Public Prosecutor in several cases. In 2001, he presented the prosecution's case against three men—Wan Kamil Mohamed Shafian, 34; Ibrahim Mohamed, 35; and Rosli Ahmat, 30—who had stabbed taxi driver Koh Ngiap Yong to death with a bayonet and stole the taxi, intending to use it as a getaway vehicle when robbing goldsmith shops. In the 2005 trial of Took Leng How over the murder of Huang Na, he opened the case by outlining the prosecution's argument that Huang Na had been sexually assaulted. He subjected the defence's psychiatrist, R. Nagulendran, to a vigorous cross-examination over the latter's diagnosis that Took was schizophrenic.
