= Vadivelu Kathikesan murders =

1979 murders in Singapore

- Vadivelu Kathikesan, who committed two separate murders over a period of four months in 1979
- Location: Kallang, Singapore (June 1979); Sims Place, Singapore (October 1979)
- Date: 17 June 1979 – 16 October 1979
- Attack type: Murder
- Weapons: Unknown, presumed blunt instrument (June 1979); Wooden pole (October 1979)
- Deaths: 2
- Injuries: 0
- Victims: Abdul Rahiman Adnan (61); Mohamed Dawood Abdul Jaffar (54)
- Perpetrator: Vadivelu Kathikesan (24)
- Motive: Robbery (alleged; June 1979); Provocation (alleged; October 1979)
- Charges: Murder of Abdul Rahiman Adnan (x1); Murder of Mohamed Dawood Abdul Jaffar (x1)
- Verdict: Guilty of the murder of Mohamed Dawood; Sentenced to death in 1982; Sentence upheld in 1983; Date of execution unknown
- Convictions: Murder of Mohamed Dawood Abdul Jaffar (x1)
- Convicted: Vadivelu Kathikesan (24)
- Judge: T. Kulasekaram; Lai Kew Chai

Between 16 June 1979 and 16 October 1979, two men were murdered in different locations across Singapore. The victims were identified as 61-year-old watchman Abdul Rahiman Adnan and 54-year-old cigarette seller Mohamed Dawood Abdul Jaffar; Abdul Rahiman died on 16 June 1979 after falling victim to an alleged robbery-murder at Kallang, while Mohamed Dawood was murdered on 16 October 1979 at his stall in Sims Place. Subsequently, the police managed to link the two murders to one single suspect and trace his whereabouts. The killer, Vadivelu Kathikesan (alias Karthigesu), was arrested in Ipoh four months after the second murder and he was charged in court for both the murders. Subsequently, Vadivelu was put on trial for solely the murder of Mohamed Dawood while the other charge of killing Abdul Rahiman was temporarily withdrawn. In the end, Vadivelu was found guilty of murdering Mohamed Dawood and sentenced to death in March 1982. Vadivelu was eventually hanged sometime after losing his appeal in January 1983.

== Murder of Abdul Rahiman Adnan ==
On 17 June 1979, a watchman was found murdered at a metal company's workshop in Kallang.

The victim, identified as 61-year-old Abdul Rahiman Adnan (alias Abdul Rahman Adam), was discovered dead by his 70-year-old colleague Mohammed Yussof Noordin outside the collapsible gates, and Abdul Rahiman had an open wound on his head. The police arrived at the scene, and they found during an inspection of the scene that the office on the second floor of the company had been ransacked. It was believed that based on the preliminary investigations, Abdul Rahiman had been murdered by an intruder during a robbery bid, and the killer had made off with S$200 and some bottles of strong liquor, and a blunt instrument was suspected to have been used to inflict the fatal wounds on Abdul Rahiman.

The Abdul Rahiman case, which was classified as murder, was transferred to the Special Investigation Section of the Criminal Investigation Department (CID) for investigations. The murder, however, remained unsolved as the murderer(s) remained at large and no suspects were caught, although the real perpetrator would claim the life of his second victim four months after killing Abdul Rahiman.

== Murder of Mohamed Dawood Abdul Jaffar ==
On 16 October 1979, at Sims Place, a cigarette stall holder was found murdered in front of his stall.

The victim was identified as 54-year-old cigarette-seller Mohamed Dawood Abdul Jaffar (alias Mohamed Daud Abdul Jaffar), who hailed from India. A newspaper vendor found Mohamed Dawood lying in a pool of blood in front of his cigarette stall. It was assumed by police that Mohamed Dawood attacked while sleeping in front of his stall. The stall itself was ransacked, but there were nothing stolen from the place itself. Police recovered three bloodstained wooden sticks, which was assumed to be the murder weapons used in this case, and the police theorized that about two or three people were likely involved in the murder. According to Professor Chao Tzee Cheng, a senior forensic pathologist who examined Mohamed Dawood's body, there were at least ten external injuries found on the head of Mohamed Dawood, and one of them was sufficient in the ordinary course of nature to cause death.

Mohamed Dawood had one brother in Singapore, who could not be contacted when the news of Mohamed Dawood's murder came to light; other than that, Mohamed Dawood's wife and four children and other family members were in India and not in Singapore at the time he died. Witnesses stated that Mohamed Dawood had last visited India less than six months before he was killed.

== Arrest and charges ==
The investigations, led by Inspector Cheok Koon Seng and Deputy Superintendent Gan Boon Leong, took over the case of Mohamed Dawood Abdul Jaffar's murder, and it took them a week to identify a suspect in the case of Mohamed Dawood's murder. On 26 October 1979, the police publicly appealed for the whereabouts of a 24-year-old Singaporean man named Vadivelu Kathikesan, as they sought his assistance in the murder investigation, and he was also placed on the wanted list.

On 20 March 1980, about five months after the murder of Mohamed Dawood, at the Malaysian state of Ipoh, the Royal Malaysia Police managed to arrest Vadivelu and eight days after the arrest, Vadivelu was extradited from Malaysia to Singapore to face investigations and charges for the killing of Mohamed Dawood.

On 30 March 1980, two days after he returned in Singapore, 25-year-old Vadivelu Kathikesan was charged with murder in a district court, in relation to the October 1979 case of Mohamed Dawood's homicidal death. Vadivelu, who was jobless, was remanded for one week in police custody to assist in investigations.

After his arrest, while Vadivelu was under investigation for the murder of Mohamed Dawood, the police discovered that Vadivelu was also responsible for the murder of Abdul Rahiman Adnan back in June 1979. Therefore, on 5 April 1980, a week after Vadivelu was charged with killing Mohamed Dawood, he was brought back to court and faced a second murder charge in relation to the killing of Abdul Rahiman, and held in remand at the Central Police Division while pending investigations for the two homicides.

== Trial of Vadivelu Kathikesan ==
On 1 March 1982, 27-year-old Vadivelu Kathikesan was brought to trial for one count of murder in relation to the death of his second victim Mohamed Dawood Abdul Jaffar. The prosecution was led by Edmond Pereira, while Vadivelu was represented by criminal lawyer Subhas Anandan, who would become famous in 2001 for defending the notorious wife-killer Anthony Ler. The other charge of murder for the death of Vadivelu's first victim Abdul Rahiman Adnan was temporarily stood down during the trial proceedings for Mohamed Dawood's murder. The trial, which convened at the High Court, was presided over by two judges - Justice Lai Kew Chai and Justice T. Kulasekaram. Vadivelu pleaded not guilty to the murder charge and therefore claimed trial.

The trial court was told that on 15 October 1979, the eve of the murder, Vadivelu was entrusted by a friend to help Mohamed Dawood to renovate his cigarette stall, but the work fell through after Mohamed Dawood already engaged another person's help to complete the renovation, which sparked an argument between both sides. K. Sengaradas, a friend of Vadivelu, testified that on the night before the murder, he heard from Vadivelu that he stole S$34 from Mohamed Dawood and it caused Mohamed Dawood and Vadivelu to quarrel with one another over this, and Vadivelu drank heavily afterwards. S. P. Nadarajan, another friend of Vadivelu, testified that on 17 October 1979, about two days after the conflict between Vadivelu and Mohamed Dawood, Vadivelu told him that he had killed an "old Indian" (referring to Mohamed Dawood) by battering him with a wooden pole, and stolen a box of cigarettes from Mohamed Dawood's stall after he killed the 54-year-old victim. It was the prosecution's contention that after the drinks session at Sengaradas's house, Vadivelu committed the murder of Mohamed Dawood between midnight and 5.45am on 16 October 1979, and with the help of his friends, Vadivelu fled to Malaysia a day after the slaying. In fact, Vadivelu's statements to the police also implied his admission to murdering Mohamed Dawood, although he would claim later during his trial that he did so under sudden and grave provocation; the statements were subsequently admitted as evidence by the court, after Vadivelu raised no objection in having the statements admitted as evidence.

The prosecution closed its case after five days of hearing, and Vadivelu was called to enter his defence. On the stand, Vadivelu stated that he never had the intent to commit murder. He stated that he was gravely provoked by Mohamed Dawood at the time he murdered him. According to Vadivelu, he went to the home of his friend Sengaradas to have drinks, but he left Sengaradas's house after Sengaradas refused to let him spend the night for fear of getting complained to by his neighbours. Vadivelu passed through the stall of Mohamed Dawood at Sims Place while on the way home, and it was then, Mohamed Dawood allegedly spat at Vadivelu and insulted him as a prostitute's son and even called Vadivelu's mother a prostitute. Vadivelu was angered at this and warned Mohamed Dawood to stop doing this, and according to Vadivelu, his mother was widowed for a long time and had been the sole breadwinner of his family since Vadivelu was 14, and he thus did not want Mohamed Dawood to insult his mother. However, the warning fell on deaf ears and Mohamed Dawood persisted in doing so and even picked up a box to hit Vadivelu. Vadivelu said that as a result, he was provoked and in a fit of anger, he grabbed onto a wooden pole and used it to bash Mohamed Dawood on the head multiple times and Mohamed Dawood died as a consequence. Vadivelu said that he left the scene after stopping the assault and also stole a box of cigarettes and candy from Mohamed Dawood's stall.

On 9 March 1982, both Justice T. Kulasekaram and Justice Lai Kew Chai delivered their verdict, with Justice Kulasekaram pronouncing the decision in court. In the verdict, Justice Kulasekaram found that it was clear from the evidence that Vadivelu had brutally attacked and murdered Mohamed Dawood while the victim was lying or sleeping on his makeshift bed in front of the stall. He stated that the panel made a unanimous finding that Vadivelu could still clearly understand the magnitude of his actions even if he had consumed alcohol prior to the incident, and they stated that there was no basis for Vadivelu to claim self-defence, sudden fight or sudden and grave provocation as a partial defence to the murder charge. Having found that one of the injuries inflicted upon Mohamed Dawood was sufficient in the ordinary course of nature to cause death, the two judges were of the opinion that there were sufficient grounds to return with a verdict of murder.

Therefore, 27-year-old Vadivelu Kathikesan was found guilty of murder, and sentenced to death by hanging.

== Aftermath ==
After he was sentenced to hang for the murder of Mohamed Dawood Abdul Jaffar, during the same month itself, Vadivelu Kathikesan's second charge of murder for causing the death of Abdul Rahiman Adnan was withdrawn by the prosecution in view of Vadivelu's death sentence for murdering Mohamed Dawood. Vadivelu was therefore granted a discharge not amounting to an acquittal for the other charge of murdering Abdul Rahiman.

On 17 January 1983, without calling for the prosecution's reply, Vadivelu's appeal was dismissed by the Court of Appeal. Chief Justice Wee Chong Jin, who was one of the three judges (also including T S Sinnathuray and A P Rajah) hearing the appeal, admonished Vadivelu for committing the "worst crime" in the worst possible manner, as the appellate court found it unbelievable that Vadivelu was provoked into killing Mohamed Dawood out of sudden and grave provocation due to the victim's alleged insult, and there was no reason for Mohamed Dawood to insult Vadivelu in the first place. The appellate court also noted that evidence had clearly showed that Mohamed Dawood was lying or sleeping on his bed when Vadivelu murdered him in his sleep. Chief Justice Wee also pronounced in the judgement that the arguments from Vadivelu's lawyer J B Jeyaretnam (an opposition politician) were devoid of merit, especially the part where Jeyaretnam submitted that Vadivelu had no intent to cause death during the attack that took Mohamed Dawood's life.

Since then, Vadivelu Kathikesan was hanged at Changi Prison on an unknown date for the murders he committed. He was not listed among the 16 death row inmates remaining alive in Singapore as of April 1985.

== See also ==
- Capital punishment in Singapore
