= Murder of Jagagevan Jayaram =

2006 murder of a club security officer in Singapore

Jagagevan Jayaram
- Jagagevan Jayaram, who was stabbed 11 times and died
- Born: 9 April 1980; Singapore
- Died: 25 April 2006 (aged 26); Ang Mo Kio, Singapore
- Cause of death: Murdered
- Other name: Jagageevan Jayaram
- Occupation: Bouncer
- Known for: Murder victim

On 25 April 2006, at a playground in Ang Mo Kio, Singapore, 26-year-old Jagagevan Jayaram brought along a chopper and wanted to seek revenge on 26-year-old Sadayan Ajmeershah over a previous dispute, but it ended with Jagagevan being killed by Sadayan and his two friends who retaliated against Jagagevan's attack. Sadayan and his two friends, Arull Wanan Thangarasu and Melvin Mathenkumar Segaram, were all arrested and charged with murder; Arull was the brother-in-law of the victim. Ultimately, the charges of murder against the trio were reduced: both Melvin and Arull were convicted of causing hurt with dangerous weapons and each of them were jailed for four years with caning (eight strokes for each man), while Sadayan was convicted of the most serious charge of manslaughter, and sentenced to nine years' jail and 12 strokes of the cane despite the prosecution's urgings for the maximum sentence of life imprisonment in Sadayan's case.

== Fatal stabbing ==
On 25 April 2006, the body of a 26-year-old bouncer was found riddled with stab wounds at a playground in Ang Mo Kio. The victim, 26-year-old Jagagevan Jayaram, was pronounced dead an hour later in hospital. It was believed that, based on witness accounts, Jagagevan was attacked by a group of five or six people and therefore killed on the scene where his body was found; it was subsequently confirmed that only three people were involved in the murder.

Based on the investigations and later sources, it was revealed that Jagagevan never knew any of his attackers, but on the date of his murder, Jagagevan and one of his attackers, identified as Sadayan Ajmeershah, were involved in a dispute between Sadayan's friend and Jagagevan's sister during that morning. Sadayan, who went to Jagagevan's flat to act as mediator, allegedly spat on the ground out of anger due to Jagagevan's sister verbally abusing him, but Sadayan apologized before he left the flat. Jagagevan, who was present at the flat, was angered at this and hence, he later went with four men to Sadayan's flat, where they assaulted him by punching, kicking and even used kitchen utensils to beat up Sadayan. As a result of the assault, Sadayan suffered multiple injuries on his head, face and abdomen. Jagagevan and his friends fled before the police and ambulance arrived.

Despite the severity of his injuries, Sadayan declined to go to the hospital until he finished clearing away the mess and bloodstains in the flat. By nightfall, Sadayan's friends came to bring him to the hospital. When they passed by a nearby provision shop, the group spotted Jagagevan and his friends going after them, but a passing police car caused Jagagevan and his friends to disappear. However, Jagagevan was undeterred and still bent on harming Sadayan to satisfy his thirst for vengeance, and hence together with one of his friends, Jagagevan armed himself with a chopper and went to search for Sadayan. Sadayan was said to have seen Jagagevan and panicked when he saw Jagagevan accidentally dropping his chopper, and out of fear that Jagagevan would once again attack him, Sadayan went home to get a kitchen knife and returned to join his friends.

Subsequently, a confrontation took place between Jagagevan and Sadayan nearby the playground where Jagagevan met his end. Sadayan's two friends - Melvin Mathenkumar Segaram and Arull Wanan Thangarasu (the brother-in-law of Jagagevan) - joined in during the confrontation. Jagagevan, who swung the chopper at Sadayan's neck, was stabbed 11 times by Sadayan on the neck and abdomen, and Jagagevan died as a result of the stabbing. The trio fled the scene after they finished assaulting the deceased. At the time of his death, Jagagevan, the eldest of three children, was survived by his mother and two siblings. His family described him as a man who loved his family and they noted that he tried his best to change his ways after his release from prison in February of that same year. Jagagevan was previously jailed four times for offences like theft and fighting (including reformative training).

== Criminal charges ==
In less than half a day after the murder, the three attackers, aged between 23 and 26, surrendered themselves to the police for having caused the death of Jagagevan. Sadayan's sister, contacted her husband upon finding out what happened and both of them persuaded Sadayan to turn himself in to the police. The three suspects - Melvin Mathenkumar Segaram, Sadayan Ajmeershah and Arull Wanan Thangarasu - were charged with murder on 27 April 2006. If found guilty of murder, the trio would be given the death penalty under Section 302 of the Penal Code of Singapore.

Prior to the incident, one of the alleged attackers, Melvin, was previously convicted of rioting back in 2001. On 28 August 2000, Melvin and at least nine other men attacked a group of seven men and inflicted violence while being part of an unlawful assembly. Melvin, who was then 18 years old and was also responsible for a 1999 rioting incident, was found guilty of these rioting charges in March 2001 and sentenced to a total of 22 months in prison and six strokes of the cane.

In April 2007, both Melvin Mathenkumar Segaram and Arull Wanan Thangarasu, aged 24 and 22 respectively, were convicted of reduced charges of causing hurt with dangerous weapons. Both Melvin and Arull, who pleaded guilty, were each sentenced to four years' imprisonment and eight strokes of the cane. At that point, Sadayan was the sole person left facing a murder charge for stabbing Jagagevan to death, and he remained at Queenstown Remand Prison while pending trial.

== Trial of Sadayan Ajmeershah ==
=== Background of the accused ===
Sadayan Ajmeershah
- Born: 27 August 1980 (age 46); Singapore
- Other name: Jimmy
- Occupations: Odd-job worker (former); Bartender (former)
- Children: 1 daughter
- Parents: Sathik Sadayan (father); Ahmed Nurjehan (mother)
- Status: Released since 2015
- Motive: Out of fear and frustration due to victim's attacks and harassment
- Conviction: Manslaughter (one count)
- Criminal charges: Murder (one count)
- Penalty: Nine years' imprisonment and 12 strokes of the cane

The main perpetrator, Sadayan Ajmeershah, was born in Singapore on 27 August 1980. Sadayan was the youngest of four children, and had two older brothers and one older sister. Sadayan studied up to secondary school and completed his N-levels, but he dropped out afterwards. Sadayan completed his National Service in 2002, and he worked odd jobs afterwards, and eventually, he was employed as a bartender in a nightclub. Prior to the murder, Sadayan originally planned to marry his fiancée in May 2006, and he had been living together with the woman in a rental flat at Ang Mo Kio. The couple's first child, a daughter, was born in November 2006 while Sadayan was still in remand awaiting trial for the murder of Jagagevan Jayaram.

In fact, before his first run-in with the law, Sadayan received a police commendation for helping to nab several thieves in 1998, but four years later, from 2002 to 2006, Sadayan had gotten into trouble with the law for five separate offences, including a case of theft committed with two more men in 2002 while he was still serving his National Service. Sadayan had spent a total of two months in jail for these offences, including one week of prison time for the aforementioned theft offence. Another one of these offences pertained to an incident where Sadayan had assaulted a public servant.

=== Plea of guilt and conviction ===
Originally, on 10 May 2007, 26-year-old Sadayan Ajmeershah was slated to face trial for a reduced charge of culpable homicide not amounting to murder (equivalent to manslaughter in Singapore's legal context) at the High Court. However, during the hearing, Sadayan's plea of guilt did not go through, because "certain matters" could not be resolved between the prosecution and defence, and hence Sadayan's murder charge was revived, which caused Sadayan to once again faced the possibility of a death sentence if convicted of the original charge of murder. Sadayan had reportedly expressed that he rather be sentenced to death than to plead guilty to manslaughter.

On 13 August 2007, Sadayan once again stood trial at the High Court for killing 26-year-old Jagagevan Jayaram back in 2006. Sadayan's murder charge was reduced to manslaughter after some developments in his case. In a hearing convened before Justice Tay Yong Kwang of the High Court, Sadayan, who would turn 27 in two weeks' time, pleaded guilty to the manslaughter charge and therefore convicted as charged. The possible punishment which Sadayan could face for manslaughter was either life imprisonment or up to ten years' imprisonment (in addition to a possible fine or caning).

=== Submissions and sentencing ===
The prosecution, led by Lee Cheow Han, sought the maximum sentence of life imprisonment, describing Sadayan as a "danger to the society" due to his frequent run-ins with the law, most of which were violence offences, and they even raised the fact that Sadayan's father brought up a personal protection order against his son, and they pointed out there was no justification for Sadayan to inflict 11 knife wounds on Jagagevan, and they stated that Sadayan did not show remorse for killing Jagagevan, since Sadayan disposed of the knife after the crime and only surrendered after hearing that his friends gave themselves up, and even tried pinning the blame on the victim rather than taking responsibility of his actions. A psychiatric report revealed that Sadayan suffered from anti-social personality disorder, which highlighted Sadayan's disregard for authority and social norms, and demonstrated his tendency to resort to violence, and he had a high risk of re-offending. Based on this, the prosecution strongly urged the court to sentence Sadayan to a life term for the protection of society.

In rebuttal, Sadayan's defence counsel - consisting of veteran lawyers Peter Keith Fernando and Subhas Anandan and Sunil Sudheesan (Anandan's nephew) - argued that Sadayan should be given ten years' jail rather than life imprisonment. Anandan argued that while Sadayan was at fault for killing Jagagevan and never sought the help of the police, he stated that Jagagevan was not an innocent angel either because he was clearly the aggressor and had been the one who sparked the whole turn of events, which made him partly responsible for his own demise at the hands of Sadayan and his friends, who only retaliated due to Jagagevan's remorseless quest for revenge, and Sadayan was indeed remorseful and filled with anguish for having stabbed the victim due to Jagagevan's non-stop harassment. Fernando also added that Sadayan, who was then holding a stable job and looking forward to become both a husband and father, was merely caught up in a "web of unfortunate circumstances and incidents that escalated out of control". In a dramatic and yet touching turn of events during the session, Sadayan personally submitted a letter to the trial court, pleading for a second chance and mercy from the law. Sadayan stated that he was feeling sad and sorry for what happened, and on top of that, Sadayan wrote that through this ordeal, he truly realized how much his father loved him a lot, as Sadayan's father had actually sold off their family flat and dedicated both the proceeds and his personal life-savings to engage the best lawyers to represent his son, and Sadayan wrote that he misunderstood that his father did not love him but hated him. Sadayan also expressed his wish to be filial to his father and wanted to repay him, and he hoped to return to his daughter's side and take care of her.

On that same day, Justice Tay Yong Kwang delivered his verdict, sentencing 26-year-old Sadayan Ajmeershah to nine years in jail. Despite the numerous arguments raised by the prosecution in favour of life imprisonment, Justice Tay refused to impose a life sentence in Sadayan's case, which, in the judge's words, "reflects the sad truth and tragedy about vengeance and violence". Justice Tay pointed out that the reason why the attack started was because of the victim Jagagevan himself, who repeatedly harassed Sadayan and his friends and kept going after them out of revenge, and Jagagevan over-reacted by seeking revenge with a chopper over a trivial incident. Justice Tay also said that throughout the events leading up to the murder, Sadayan had never for once wanted to cause harm and only wanted peace after being dragged into the mud by other people's disputes, and he himself never fought back even when Jagagevan assaulted him hours before the killing, which resulted from Jagagevan's own actions and Sadayan's "frantic frustration". Justice Tay also quoted, "The deceased’s (Jagagevan's) family has lost a son and the accused (Sadayan) will be punished accordingly too. The feud must end here. The sorrow suffered by both families should not be repeated."

Hence, Justice Tay determined that on the balance of probabilities, it was inappropriate and unduly harsh to subject Sadayan to life in prison, and he believed that by sentencing Sadayan to nine years' imprisonment with caning, Sadayan would be using his time in prison wisely to mature and undergo rehabilitation, and become a better person. Justice Tay also personally addressed Sadayan, advising him to remember his promise to change and to look up to his daughter as a "beacon of hope" for him to start afresh after his release. On top of the nine-year jail term, Justice Tay also added 12 strokes of the cane to Sadayan's sentence, and the prison sentence was backdated to the date of Sadayan's arrest on 26 April 2006.

Since 2015, Sadayan Ajmeershah had since been released from prison after completing his jail term.

== Aftermath ==
Less than a week after his son's sentencing, Sadayan's 69-year-old father agreed to be interviewed by the national newspaper The Straits Times and speak about his son's case. Sadayan's father said that he and Sadayan had a strained relationship, given that he and his son often clashed with each other. Sadayan's father believed in tough love and even booted his son out of the home with hopes to make him grow up, but he never expected his son to go astray and got into trouble with the law several times. By the time he got wind of Sadayan's arrest for the murder of Jagagevan Jayaram, Sadayan's father could not continue to stand by and tried finding ways to help his son the best he could, and even sold his 30-year-old four-room flat in Marine Parade, and forked out S$2,500 from the proceeds of the flat's sale to pay for his son's legal fees, before moving into a three-room flat at Hougang. Sadayan's father said that he considered this decision a small sacrifice for the sake of his son and dearly loved him, and he was touched to see his son's letter. Sadayan's father also stated that he was willing to allow Sadayan to come and live with him once he was released, and it was mentioned that he and his wife were regularly taking care of Sadayan's daughter whenever the girl's mother was at work. Sadayan's 31-year-old sister also told the press that her brother often partied around during his youth, and their father hated a lot about Sadayan coming back home late, and thus their father-son relationship was very rocky and filled with conflicts. Sadayan's sister also said that in the past, their father tend to favour Sadayan's brothers over Sadayan as they were both the "studious type" unlike Sadayan.

Eight years after he took up the case, Sadayan's former lawyer Subhas Anandan died from heart failure in January 2015 at the age of 67. His second and last book, It's Easy to Cry, was posthumously published in October 2015, nine months after his death. Anandan, who finished writing his book prior to his death, mentioned the case of Sadayan Ajmeershah, and he admitted that he did not originally represent Sadayan during his trial, and it was his old friend and fellow lawyer Peter Fernando who handled Sadayan's case and helped Sadayan to get his murder charge reduced to manslaughter. Anandan stated that prior to Sadayan's sentencing, Sadayan's father sought his help to take over the case and represent his son in mitigation and sentencing, and Anandan asked that he could only accept the case on the condition that Fernando was retained as Sadayan's counsel as well, and the compromise was accepted by Sadayan's father.

Anandan found that Sadayan was a "pleasant man" on his first meeting but he was most surprised when Sadayan wrote a handwritten letter to acknowledge his guilt and his wish to repay his father's love, which he regretted not knowing earlier. Anandan stated that he originally persuaded the judge to refrain from imposing life imprisonment and mete out a jail term of ten years, but after receiving the letter, Justice Tay Yong Kwang was touched to see Sadayan's letter and hence made the exception of taking away one year from Anandan's proposed sentence, and allowed Sadayan to serve only nine years in jail. Anandan also revealed that Sadayan was grateful towards Anandan for charging him a nominal fee since his family was not well-to-do, and he wanted to donate his kidney to Anandan to repay him, but Anandan declined to accept Sadayan's kidney and said that he represented Sadayan to not get his kidney but only to help a man who did wrong due to circumstances, and advised Sadayan to keep his promise to reform and be filial for his father. Anandan also stated that he hoped society could be more compassionate to ex-convicts like Sadayan, who all wanted to turn over a new leaf and be less judgemental.

In 2014, an education bursary award for ex-offenders was established in the name of Anandan and it aimed to help ex-offenders to re-integrate into society. In 2019, four years after the death of Anandan, a launch ceremony relating to the bursary was held to hold remembrance of the late Anandan's legacy. Senior Minister for Law Edwin Tong, who made a speech during the ceremony, brought up the case of Sadayan Ajmeershah as one of Anandan's iconic cases where he dedicated himself to his belief of second chances by submitting a mitigation plea to avoid a possible life sentence for Sadayan. Minister Tong stated that Anandan's legacy lived on as many of the ex-offenders who were Anandan's former clients had worked hard to make their lives better and wisely used their second chances in life, and he stated that the fund and other future measures could help to build a more compassionate society to help ex-convicts to re-integrate and undergo rehabilitation to keep them out of a life of crime.

== See also ==
- Caning in Singapore
- List of major crimes in Singapore
