= Murder of Shamsul Hameed =

1993 murder of an Indian moneychanger in Singapore

- Date: 8 – 9 October 1993
- Location: Jalan Berseh, Singapore
- Motive: Allegedly out of anger
- Deaths: Shamsul Hameed K M Mohamed Kassim Rowther, 50
- Convicted: Jahabar Bagurudeen, 23
- Sentence: Death penalty

On 8 October 1993, at his Jalan Berseh flat, an Indian moneychanger named Shamsul Hameed was killed by his friend Jahabar Bagurudeen. Bagurudeen, a businessman, was said to have killed Shamsul due to them having argued earlier about sharing a prostitute. Bagurudeen was sentenced to death after the trial court accepted the same prostitute's testimony that she saw Bagurudeen killing the victim, and rejected Bagurudeen's argument that he killed Shamsul out of anger for the victim's alleged mistreatment of Bagurudeen before the murder. After losing his appeal and clemency plea, Bagurudeen was hanged on 2 June 1995.

== Murder ==
On 9 October 1993, a man arrived at his colleague's flat at Jalan Berseh, where he found his colleague dead inside the flat. His gold chain (worth S$2,000) and a Rolex watch worth S$6,000 were also found to be missing.

The deceased victim was identified as Shamsul Hameed, who was fifty years old at the time of his death, and he came from India. His registered full name was Shamsul Hameed K M Mohamed Kassim Rowther, and he worked as a moneychanger. Shamsul, who was a Muslim, left behind a wife and two sons, who were all residing in India as of the time he was killed. It was also determined that Shamsul was strangled to death, either during the previous night of 8 October or during the early morning hours of 9 October. Shamsul's colleagues stated that Shamsul was absent from work that morning and it made them worried about him, and they were shocked to hear that he was murdered, with the police concluding that robbery was a possible motive for the killing. A neighbor also told the press that Shamsul liked hanging out with his friends, drinking and chatting with them downstairs at the coffee shop or at his flat. It was also suspected that a person known to Shamsul was the culprit behind his murder, because there were no signs of a forced entry into Shamsul's flat.

On 13 October 1993, after four days of investigation, the police arrested a 23-year-old suspect for allegedly killing Shamsul. The suspect, Jahabar Bagurudeen, who was an Indian citizen and businessman, was charged with murder. He was said to the last person seen with the victim before the killing took place.

== Trial proceedings ==
On 30 June 1994, Jahabar Bagurudeen stood trial at the High Court for one count of murdering Shamsul Hameed by strangulation. Deputy Public Prosecutor (DPP) Ong Hian Sun was the trial prosecutor, and Bagurudeen was represented by veteran criminal lawyer Subhas Anandan during his trial. Judicial Commissioner Amarjeet Singh was appointed as the trial judge of Bagurudeen's case.

Saminathan Porkkodi, a 19-year-old Indian prostitute, came to court to testify that she witnessed Bagurudeen murdering Shamsul on the night of 8 October 1993. She told the court that she first saw Bagurudeen attacking Shamsul from behind and pulled the victim's gold chain and penchant towards himself to strangle the victim. However, the chain broke due to Bagurudeen using excessive force, and hence he settled on a rope to continue strangling Shamsul until he died. After which, according to Saminathan, she was instructed by Bagurudeen to retrieve Shamsul's gold valuables while he himself collect items he touched before to prevent leaving behind his fingerprints at the crime scene. Saminathan also testified that Bagurudeen brought her to a hotel in Geylang to book a room, where he instructed Saminathan to lie to the police that she witnessed two Indian men strangling Shamsul to death should the cops arrest her. Bagurudeen even made arrangements for Saminathan to return to India, but she managed to escape and inform a friend about the murder, and subsequently made a police report, leading to Bagurudeen's arrest when he attended Shamsul's funeral. Items recovered at the crime scene also yielded fingerprints, which matched to Bagurudeen's fingerprints and thus further proved he was present at the scene before the murder.

Bagurudeen, who elected to give his defense, testified that on the night itself, he and Shamsul gathered at the latter's flat for drinks and they agreed to share one prostitute for the night. But when Saminathan arrived, they argued over sharing her and not only that, Bagurudeen alleged that Shamsul was disrespectful towards him and demanded him to buy food for him, and also insulted Bagurudeen as a "son of a prostitute", which caused Bagurudeen to strangle Shamsul out of uncontrollable anger and loss of self-control. Bagurudeen's lawyer Subhas Anandan argued that Bagurudeen had lost his self control as a result of provocation induced by the victim's insult and mistreatment towards him in front of the prostitute, which led to Bagurudeen strangling Shamsul in a frenzy and that his charge of murder should be amended to manslaughter, a lesser offence of unlawful killing that warranted either a life sentence or up to ten years' imprisonment.

In rebuttal, DPP Ong Hian Sun argued that based on the evidence, Bagurudeen attempted to distance himself from the killing and deflect blame from himself, based on the lies he told and whatever lies he instructed Saminathan to convey to the police. He also pointed out that Saminathan testified earlier on that Shamsul never insulted Bagurudeen before the strangulation, and asked that his defense of sudden and grave provocation should be rejected. DPP Ong also cited the forensic evidence which showed that a great amount of force had been exerted by the assailant during the strangulation of Shamsul and there was a large concentration of alcohol in Shamsul's blood, suggesting that Shamsul was drunk and rendered unable to defend himself during the strangulation. DPP Ong also summarize that from the outset, it was clear that Bagurudeen had the intent to cause Shamsul's death and he never done so under a loss of self-control as he claimed, and sought a guilty verdict of murder.

On 6 July 1994, Judicial Commissioner Amarjeet Singh delivered his verdict. He stated that he accepted the testimony of Saminathan that Bagurudeen had murdered Shamsul, since she was present at the scene of crime but never took part in the murder. The judge also aligned his stance with the prosecution's arguments and thus rejected that Bagurudeen was under sudden and grave provocation when killing the victim, and in turn, rejecting Bagurudeen's claim of having no intention to cause Shamsul's death. Therefore, 24-year-old Jahabar Bagurudeen was found guilty of murder, and sentenced to death. Under Section 302 of the Penal Code, the death penalty was prescribed as the mandatory punishment for offenders convicted of murder within Singapore's jurisdiction.

== Execution ==
After the end of his trial, Bagurudeen appealed against his conviction and sentence, but the Court of Appeal rejected his appeal on 24 October 1994.

After the loss of his appeal, Bagurudeen remained on death row for another eight months before he was scheduled to hang on 2 June 1995. After receiving word of Bagurudeen's death warrant, an international human rights group, known as Amnesty International, submitted a plea to the Government of Singapore on 30 May 1995, asking the government for presidential clemency in Bagurudeen's case and commute his death sentence to life imprisonment, stating that the death penalty was a violation of one's right to life and was a "cruel and inhumane" punishment, and also weighed in their plea on Bagurudeen's trial defence to seek a reconsideration of Bagurudeen's case. Bagurudeen himself also submitted a personal petition for clemency in a final bid to escape the gallows.

Despite so, then President of Singapore Ong Teng Cheong dismissed Bagurudeen's clemency appeal, and on 2 June 1995, 25-year-old Jahabar Bagurudeen was hanged at dawn in Changi Prison as originally scheduled. On the same date of Bagurudeen's execution, a 45-year-old labourer named Ismail bin Sumali was put to death for trafficking 29.63g of diamorphine. Ismail, whose clemency plea was also rejected, was found guilty of the said offence in May 1994 and had lost his appeal in September of that same year.

In the aftermath, Singaporean crime show Crimewatch re-enacted the case and it aired in October 1996. Besides the murder of Shamsul Hameed, the episode itself also broadcast a public appeal to seek a murder suspect named Sim Eng Teck, who fatally stabbed a businessman outside a shopping mall.

== See also ==
- Capital punishment in Singapore
