= Murder of Jaranjeet Singh =

1998 murder of a prison warden at Geylang, Singapore

Jaranjeet Singh
- Jaranjeet Singh, the prison warden who was attacked and killed
- Born: Jaranjeet Singh s/o Darshan Singh; 1958; Singapore
- Died: 10 May 1998 (aged 40); Geylang, Singapore
- Cause of death: Murdered
- Occupation: Prison warden
- Employer: Singapore Prison Service (1983 – 1998)
- Known for: Murder victim
- Spouse: Pritam Kaur (m. 1980)
- Children: 3

On the early morning of 10 May 1998, at a coffee shop in Geylang, 40-year-old prison warden Jaranjeet Singh, a Sikh Singaporean, was attacked by two men, one of whom was earlier involved in a quarrel with a prostitute he engaged, for allegedly staring at them. During the attack, Jaranjeet was stabbed on the throat by one of the men using a broken beer bottle, causing Jaranjeet to bleed to death since the broken bottle had cut through a major blood vessel at his neck. Within the same month of his murder, the two attackers, Saminathan Subramaniam and S. Nagarajan Kuppusamy, both 38 years old, were arrested and charged with murder.

Eventually, one of the killers, Saminathan, who had a long criminal record since his youth, was sentenced to six strokes of the cane and nine months' imprisonment for causing hurt with a dangerous weapon while Nagarajan, the other killer identified to be the one who fatally slashed Jaranjeet, was found guilty of murder and sentenced to death in October 1998, and after he lost his appeal, Nagarajan was put to death by hanging for the crime on 23 July 1999.

== Murder ==
On the early morning of 10 May 1998, at a coffee shop in Geylang, Singapore's red-light district, a man was slashed on the throat and died on the spot. The fatal slashing was the eighth case of murder that occurred within the past month itself.

The victim was identified as Jaranjeet Singh s/o Darshan Singh, better known as Jaranjeet Singh, a 40-year-old prison warden who worked at the now-defunct Queenstown Remand Prison (still in operation back in 1998). Jaranjeet, who worked for about fifteen years in the prison department since 1983, was survived by his wife and three children – a daughter aged 15 and two sons aged 11 and three respectively. According to his 34-year-old wife Pritam Kaur (who married Jaranjeet 18 years prior per an arranged marriage) and others who knew him, Jaranjeet was a devoted father and husband, and a well-mannered person who never argued with anyone, and his death came as a shock to his family, friends and colleagues from the prison he worked at. As a result of her late husband's alleged murder, Pritam and her children had to move out of their three-room flat from the prison quarters, and moved to a four-room flat at Hougang, and having stopped working for more than ten years since the birth of her elder son, Pritam had to find a job to make a living while her children would be cared for by her husband's mother, who remained supportive of her after Jaranjeet's death. Jaranjeet's funeral was held at Silat Road Temple.

According to the witnesses of the attack (including the 62-year-old shop owner Hong Zhu Xian), Jaranjeet was at the coffee shop with two prostitutes, drinking beer and having a chat with the women. During the drinking session, a group of four dark-skinned men approached Jaranjeet's table, with one of the men confronting one of the prostitutes over an alleged monetary debt that the woman owed from him. Jaranjeet reportedly intervened and tried to stop the argument, and it led to the man and one of his friends breaking two beer bottles and assault Jaranjeet, and one of the attackers used a broken beer bottle to cut Jaranjeet's throat, and it resulted in Jaranjeet to bleed to death due to the broken glass having cut through a major blood vessel on his neck. The attackers, who were described to be in their thirties and of Indian descent, were last seen to have fled the coffee shop with their other two friends in a Proton car under a Malaysian-registered car number, and a nationwide police appeal was made to arrest the alleged killers of Jaranjeet, whose death was classified as a case of murder by the police.

On 18 May 1998, the two suspected killers of Jaranjeet were arrested, and they were charged two days later with murder. The two suspects - 38-year-old S. Nagarajan Kuppusamy and 38-year-old Saminathan Subramaniam (who were both friends and Singaporeans) - were remanded without bail for investigations, and at the time of the offence, Nagarajan was working as a lorry driver while Saminathan was working under a delivery business. Both men faced the death penalty if found guilty of murder.

== Nagarajan's murder trial ==
On 1 October 1998, the murder trial of S. Nagarajan Kuppusamy took place at the High Court. By then, Nagarajan was the sole person who remained facing the murder charge, because the other suspect, Saminathan Subramanian, had his charge reduced to one of causing hurt with a dangerous weapon, and Saminathan's case was still pending as of the time when Nagarajan's trial for murdering Jaranjeet Singh was ongoing. During the trial itself, several witnesses of the fatal slashing, including the two prostitutes and the coffee shop owner's 32-year-old son Tiang Wen Jiann, testified for the prosecution, which was led by Deputy Public Prosecutor (DPP) Lim Jit Hee of the Attorney-General's Chambers, and Nagarajan was represented by veteran lawyer N. Ganesan during the proceedings.

According to Nagarajan's account, when he was at the coffee shop with Saminathan, he noticed that Jaranjeet was listlessly staring at him during his confrontation of one of the prostitutes, and Nagarajan felt gravely offended by this, and he asked Jaranjeet why he did so, but Jaranjeet remained staring at him. The court was told that at that time, Jaranjeet was listening to his Walkman and could not hear what Nagarajan was speaking, and regardless, Nagarajan was enraged by this and he therefore picked up a beer bottle and broke it, and he attacked Jaranjeet, which ended with Nagarajan murdering Jaranjeet by fatally slitting his throat. Nagarajan even claimed that Jaranjeet spewed insults of his mother during the dispute and he also claimed that he was drunk and cannot remember using a broken beer bottle to slash Jaranjeet's throat despite the prosecution's case against him.

== Nagarajan's sentencing ==
Nagarajan, the former lorry driver who was found guilty of murdering Jaranjeet and sentenced to death.

On 8 October 1998, after a trial lasting five days, Judicial Commissioner (JC) Choo Han Teck, the trial judge, delivered his verdict. In his judgement, JC Choo rejected Nagarajan's defences, and instead, he described the killing of Jaranjeet as a cold-blooded one and stated that Nagarajan had ruthlessly murdered Jaranjeet over a trivial staring incident, which he equated as an "outright assault against a defenceless man". JC Choo also pointed out that even if Jaranjeet's disputed verbal insult towards Nagarajan's mother was proven true, it would not have driven a person in Nagarajan's position to inflict such a savage attack on Jaranjeet.

The judge also cited in his verdict that it was clear based on the legal doctrine to convict a person of murder, Nagarajan had intentionally plunged the broken beer bottle into Jaranjeet's throat and it resulted in Jaranjeet sustaining a massive, yet fatal, loss of blood and died as a result of the attack, and the doctrine under the Penal Code also emphasised that an offender's act of intentionally inflicting an injury to a victim which could result in the victim's death in the ordinary course of nature should be considered as murder. In conclusion, JC Choo found 38-year-old S. Nagarajan Kuppusamy guilty of murder, and sentenced him to death. Under the laws of Singapore back in 1998, the death penalty was mandated as the sole sentence for murder, and all judges in Singapore had no discretion to sentence murder offenders to any other punishment besides the death sentence upon their convictions. Nagarajan was reportedly calm during sentencing, but he later broke down as he was escorted out of the courtroom by prison officers.

According to the New Paper, Nagarajan's death sentence was a huge emotional blow to his younger brother, mother, wife and 17-year-old elder son who were present in court to hear the verdict. Additionally, the murder charge of Nagarajan took a toll on his family's situation, as Nagarajan was the sole breadwinner of his family and his arrest led to his wife and three children to fall upon hard times emotionally and financially. Nagarajan's 37-year-old wife, a housewife who married Nagarajan 18 years prior, stated that she and her eldest son had to hide the truth from her seven-year-old daughter and infant son (who was born a month before Nagarajan's trial), who were both unaware of their father's upcoming execution. Nagarajan's wife reportedly felt regretful and sorry for the bereaved wife of her husband's victim, when she heard that Jaranjeet's widow was also left alone with three children to care for. Jaranjeet's brother, a 45-year-old civil servant, told the paper that he was glad justice was served, and stated that his family were still helping to support his late brother's wife and children.

== Nagarajan's appeal and execution ==
After he was sentenced to hang, Nagarajan appealed against his conviction and sentence, with veteran lawyer Subhas Anandan arguing the appeal on his behalf. However, the appeal was unanimously rejected by the Court of Appeal on 18 January 1999, after a three-judge panel, consisting of Chief Justice Yong Pung How and two Judges of Appeal L P Thean and M Karthigesu, affirmed the trial judge's findings that Nagarajan was not drunk at the time of the killing and had committed murder by intentionally cutting Jaranjeet Singh's throat and caused him to bleed to death.

On 23 July 1999, a year and two months after he killed Jaranjeet, 39-year-old S. Nagarajan Kuppusamy was hanged at dawn in Changi Prison, and on the same date of Nagarajan's execution, there were two Singaporean drug traffickers from death row - Mohammed Noor Bayasin and Gulam Notan Mohammed Shariff - who were also executed at the same timing.

== Fate of Saminathan and aftermath ==
In the aftermath of Nagarajan's murder trial and execution, his former accomplice and friend Saminathan Subramaniam was found guilty of using a deadly weapon to cause hurt to Jaranjeet Singh (since he smashed a beer bottle onto Jaranjeet's head), and he was sentenced to nine months' imprisonment with six strokes of the cane on 23 April 1999. Prior to his involvement in Jaranjeet's killing, Saminathan was previously jailed several times since his youth for various offences ranging from housebreaking, robbery and drug-related offences.

After his release sometime in 1999, Saminathan married a 39-year-old woman named Sarojah Ayasamy, and lived together with his wife and his wife's two intellectually-disabled siblings. Although Saminathan's family members believed that he had changed his ways, Saminathan was once again charged with murder in March 2002 when he used a sari to strangle his wife's 78-year-old godfather Karichiappan Perumal to death during a heated argument. Subsequently, Saminathan's charge of murder was reduced to manslaughter, allowing Saminathan to escape the gallows a second time, but in the end, Saminathan was sentenced to life imprisonment and 18 strokes of the cane for both the killing and a second charge of robbing the elderly victim of his valuables. Coincidentally, the trial judge Choo Han Teck, who was presiding Saminathan's case, was the same judge that sentenced Nagarajan to the gallows for killing Jaranjeet back in 1998. Saminathan's friend Swaran Singh, who abetted him to restrain and strangle the old man, was never caught till today.

In the aftermath of his manslaughter trial, Saminathan lost his appeal against his life sentence (which was backdated to the date of his remand) in January 2003, and hence, Saminathan remained in prison serving his sentence since then, unless he became eligible to be released on parole after spending a minimum period of twenty years in jail.

The case of Nagarajan and Jaranjeet was briefly mentioned and featured by Singaporean crime show True Files when an episode re-enacting Saminathan killing his wife's godfather and his assault of Jaranjeet (shown in a flashback) was first broadcast on television on 5 February 2007.

== See also ==
- Caning in Singapore
- Capital punishment in Singapore
