= Heng Boon Chai =

Singaporean convicted killer

- Born: 1978 (age 47–48); Singapore
- Status: Incarcerated since 2021
- Convictions: 2007; Culpable homicide not amounting to murder 2021; Murder
- Penalty: 2007; 8 years' imprisonment 2021; Life imprisonment and ten strokes of the cane

Details
- Imprisoned at: Changi Prison, Singapore

Heng Boon Chai (born 1978) is a Singaporean citizen who was convicted of killing two people in 2007 and 2021 respectively. In September 2007, Heng was first arrested for the knife attack of his uncle Heng Kim Teck, who was mortally wounded and died a few days later while in hospital. Heng was originally charged with attempted murder, which was upgraded to murder upon the death of his uncle. However, after a psychiatric examination revealed that Heng was suffering from schizophrenia, which severely impaired his mental state at the time of the killing, Heng was sentenced to eight years in jail after he pleaded guilty to a reduced charge of manslaughter.

Six years after killing his uncle, Heng was released in 2013 on parole, and continued to live in Singapore. However, eight years after his release, Heng fatally stabbed his neighbour Kim Wee Ming on 14 July 2021 as a result of a dispute at his flat in Sumang Walk, Punggol. Heng was therefore arrested and charged with murder a second time, and on 7 November 2024, Heng was found guilty of murder and sentenced to life imprisonment and ten strokes of the cane.

== Personal life ==
Heng Boon Chai was born in Singapore in 1978. Heng, the youngest of three children, had one sister and one brother. Little was known about Heng's early years in life.

In 1998, Heng's older brother, who suffered from schizophrenia, committed suicide by jumping off from the flat. Reportedly, Heng witnessed the death of his brother and it traumatized him greatly, and his family noted that Heng's character underwent a drastic change after the incident, and this became worse when Heng's grandfather died in 2000. Heng was said to be very close to his grandfather and often played Chinese checkers with him, a fact which made the impact of his grandfather's death all the more deeply felt.

== First murder and trial ==
=== Murder of Heng Kim Teck ===
On 4 September 2007, at Telok Blangah, Heng Boon Chai, then 29 years old, attacked his uncle Heng Kim Teck with a knife, which resulted in the 55-year-old's death four days after the brutal knife attack.

According to sources, Heng and his uncle had a close relationship. However, due to an undiagnosed condition of schizophrenia, Heng began to experience delusional thoughts and on the day of the attack, Heng irrationally believed that his uncle had caused the deaths of his elder brother and grandfather, and it drove him into taking three knives to stab Kim Teck multiple times. Prior to this, Heng had gone to look for his uncle, causing trouble and having quarrels. The attack itself was so violent that there were bloodstains leading from the sixth floor to the ground floor, due to continued bleeding from Heng's wounds.

Despite being mortally wounded, Kim Teck did not immediately die from his injuries and he was taken to the hospital to receive treatment in the ICU. Heng was simultaneously placed under arrest, and he was charged with attempted murder on 6 September 2007, and the offence itself carried the maximum sentence of life imprisonment.

Merely two days after Heng was first arraigned in court, Kim Teck died at the age of 55 on 8 September 2007; a medical report also revealed that even if Kim Teck survived, both his eyesight and brain would be impaired and damaged. As a result of Kim Teck's death, the case of attempted murder was re-classified as murder, and Heng's original charge of attempted murder was amended to murder, a capital offence that warranted the mandatory death penalty in Singapore if found guilty. While Heng was pending trial for the murder of his uncle, his parents engaged then Singapore's top criminal lawyer Subhas Anandan (and Anandan's nephew Sunil Sudheesan) to represent Heng, who was ordered to undergo psychiatric evaluation while in remand.

During his psychiatric remand, the government psychiatrists found that Heng was suffering from paranoid schizophrenia, and the condition was so severe that it impaired his mental responsibility at the time of the murder. Anandan, who recorded Heng's case in his autobiography, stated that during his interactions with Heng at the remand prison, he noted that Heng suffered from countless delusions, one of which was that Heng was the leader of a gang with 30,000 to 40,000 members and his uncle was a rival gang leader who wanted to hurt his gang. Another was that Heng wanted to kill Kim Teck in order to obtain Kim Teck's gun for the purpose of an armed robbery attempt, but Kim Teck never owned a gun in reality. A third delusion was that he wanted money to marry a girl with whom he was supposed to live together. A fourth delusion was that Heng had a girlfriend who was pregnant with his child but left for Malaysia after aborting their baby; the girlfriend later informed him by telephone that Heng's child was still alive and she never went through with the abortion.

=== Reduction of murder charge and trial ===
In light of the psychiatric reports that diagnosed Heng with schizophrenia, the prosecution reduced the original charge of murder to a lesser offence of culpable homicide not amounting to murder, which was equivalent to manslaughter in Singaporean legal context.

Heng subsequently went on trial at the High Court for the manslaughter of his uncle on 23 May 2008. Heng pleaded guilty to the charge, and the defence asked for leniency on the grounds that Heng had been accepting treatment and he would no longer pose as a threat to society. Anandan sought a sentence of four to six years' jail while the prosecution, led by Winodan Vinesh and Peter Koi, asked for not less than ten years' jail. A sentencing hearing was scheduled to be held on a later date after the trial judge, Woo Bih Li, asked for additional psychiatric evidence for the purpose of better determining Heng's custodial sentence.

During a subsequent court hearing, Dr Tan Lay Ling, a government psychiatrist assigned to treat Heng in prison, testified that Heng had responded well to treatment and his condition was improving much since his remand. Dr Tan also stated that despite this optimistic outlook, in many case studies, 80% of patients with schizophrenia was at risk of a possible relapse, and Heng should be kept in an environment that allows close monitoring of psychotic symptoms, with Changi Prison having better facilities to monitor his condition.

Prior to Heng's sentencing, Anandan informed the trial judge that he would be amending his request of sentence to a jail term of more than six years, reasoning that his client's case should carry the emphasis of protecting the public from a mentally ill offender, and in the case of Heng, he noted that based on Dr Tan's report and her testimony over the possibility of relapses for schizophrenic people, Heng should be given a jail term that achieved not just the purpose of safeguarding public safety but also the personal safety of the offender. Anandan, who recounted the experience in his book, wrote that Justice Woo smiled at him after he asked for a higher sentence for Heng.

On 1 August 2008, 30-year-old Heng Boon Chai was sentenced to eight years' imprisonment. The sentence was backdated to the date of Heng's remand on 5 September 2007.

In 2009, The Best I Could, the memoir of Heng's former lawyer Subhas Anandan, who died in 2015, was published, and Heng's case was recorded in the book. The book was later adapted into a television series in 2014, with Heng's case being re-enacted and broadcast as the 11th episode of the show's second season.

== Later life and second murder ==
=== Release in 2013 and later life ===
After serving two-thirds of his eight-year jail term (equivalent to five years and four months) with good behaviour, Heng Boon Chai was granted parole and released in 2013.

After his release, Heng continued to live in Singapore and under regular treatment for schizophrenia, and his parents divorced in 2017. In 2018, Heng moved out of a care centre and lived with his mother at her one-room rental flat in Sumang Walk, near Punggol Central.

=== Murder of Kim Wee Ming ===
Three years after moving in to Sumang Walk, Heng committed the murder of his neighbour on 14 July 2021.

Two years prior in 2019, Heng and his mother first met his neighbour Kim Wee Ming, a hawker stall assistant who first moved into the same block that same year. Initially, the mother-son pair shared a cordial relationship with Kim, and they often exchanged pleasantries with each other whenever they met along the corridor, and Kim offered them pineapple tarts during Chinese New Year.

Starting from early 2020, however, the relationship between Kim and both Heng and his mother began to deteriorate. Kim was constantly frustrated with Heng's mother for often making too much noise whenever she closed the gate and door of her flat. When the COVID-19 pandemic restrictions kicked in, Heng's mother would leave her home multiple times at night, between 7pm and 4am, to throw rubbish at the common rubbish chute. As a result, there were frequent arguments between Kim and the mother-son pair. At one point, Heng explained that their door was damaged, and he told Kim that he had once been in prison for killing someone before, with hopes that Kim would stop disturbing them, but it continued on.

On 14 July 2021, Kim, who was drunk at that time, arrived at the doorstep of Heng and hurled vulgarities at Heng through the metal gate. Heng, who was alone in home at that time, tried to pacify Kim but was punched in the face. Kim even went as far as to insult Heng and challenged him into a fight. Heng asked Kim to go back home, but Kim returned with a knife he retrieved from his flat, and pointed it at Heng, who warned him that he had a mental illness and once again reiterated that he had killed a person before. Kim unrelentingly continued to taunt Heng, threw the knife into Heng's flat and even returned to Heng's flat a second time to bang the gate with his metal wok.

The repeated harassment itself became the final proverbial straw that broke the camel's back in Heng's case, and Heng picked up Kim's knife to stab him in the neck through the gate. Kim collapsed but was still able to make a police report and even called his employer, while Heng stopped right after stabbing Kim once and called his father to tell him about the stabbing and asked him to take care of his mother. After the situation temporarily cooled off, Kim once again taunted at Heng while smoking a cigarette, and he told Heng, "If I die, you die."

Upon hearing this, Heng, who never expected Kim to return and continue harass him, grabbed the knife again and opened the gate, and finished off Kim by stabbing Kim on the neck several more times. Heng returned home, placed the knife on the table and called both his sister and mother, informing them about the death of Kim.

After murdering Kim, Heng was placed under arrest for the crime. Kim was pronounced dead at the scene by paramedics.

The murder of Kim Wee Ming happened just less than 24 hours before another murder happened in Ang Mo Kio, where 39-year-old Vietnamese national Nguyen Ngoc Giau allegedly stabbed and killed her 51-year-old Singaporean boyfriend Choy Wang Keung in one of the flats at Ang Mo Kio. Nguyen had since been charged with murder, and she was sentenced to life imprisonment on 7 October 2025 after the High Court found her guilty of murder.

== Second murder trial and life imprisonment ==
=== Murder charge and remand ===
After his arrest, Heng Boon Chai was charged with murder for a second time on 16 July 2021. At this point, due to the 2013 reform of the Singaporean death penalty laws, if there was no prerequisite intention to cause death, the offence of murder carries either the death penalty or life imprisonment under Section 302(2) of the Singaporean Penal Code.

On the same date of his arraignment, Heng was ordered to undergo psychiatric remand while pending trial for murder. A psychiatrist from the Institute of Mental Health found that despite his schizophrenia, Heng was not suffering from a psychotic relapse during the offence, and observed that the repeated provocations by Kim and the perceived threat posed to his mother were what led to Heng acting out to kill Kim.

=== Trial and sentencing ===
On 7 November 2024, Heng stood trial at the High Court for the murder of Kim Wee Ming. At this point, Heng expressed his intent to plead guilty to the charge of murder, and as a result, he was convicted accordingly and a sentencing trial took place on the same date. The defence implored the trial court to impose a life sentence and not more than ten strokes of the cane, stating that the stabbing itself was caused by Kim's repeated harassment and it escalated into a dispute that ended with the death of a man. They also submitted that after being jailed for killing his uncle, Heng genuinely wanted to live a quiet life with his mother, but the dispute resulted into this tragedy and Heng decided to plead guilty out of remorse and with hopes to reunite with his family one day.

On the other hand, the prosecution argued that Heng's schizophrenic condition did not impair his mental faculties at the time of Kim's murder and his condition was kept in check with consistent treatment, and he made the conscious choice of stabbing Kim to death when there could be other solutions to the problem he faced. The prosecution did not seek the death penalty for Heng in this case.

Justice Audrey Lim, the judge presiding Heng's trial, delivered her verdict on that day itself. She described the murder of Kim as a "particularly tragic case of a neighbourly dispute" and stated that Heng's actions of stabbing Kim to death should not be condoned even though it was Kim who started it all. Justice Lim, however, noted that Heng admitted his guilt at a very early stage and agreed with the prosecution that the death penalty was unwarranted in Heng's case, because Heng had neither exhibited viciousness nor a blatant disregard for human life in the course of the homicide. For this, Justice Lim sentenced 46-year-old Heng Boon Chai to life in prison and ten strokes of the cane. She additionally addressed the prosecution to inform prison authorities of the need to monitor Heng's psychiatric condition while in prison.

At the end of his sentencing, Heng was given permission to speak to his parents, and he reportedly teared up after seeing his 72-year-old mother tripped and fell in the courtroom. Heng was reported to have asked his father to take care of his mother before he was led away from the courtroom.

As of 2024, Heng Boon Chai remains incarcerated at Changi Prison. Although life imprisonment in Singapore was construed as a jail term that lasts the remainder of a convict's natural life in accordance to Abdul Nasir Amer Hamsah's 1997 landmark appeal, Heng was still entitled to the possibility of parole after a minimum period of 20 years behind bars.

== See also ==
- Caning in Singapore
- Life imprisonment in Singapore
- List of major crimes in Singapore
