= 1999 Ang Mo Kio child abuse case =

1999 child abuse and murder case in Singapore

- Date: October 1998 – 3 June 1999
- Location: Ang Mo Kio, Singapore
- Outcome: Chong and Sung committing crimes of cheating since November 1999; Chong and Sung arrested in August 2003 for killing Ang; Sung sentenced to jail for four years and seven months; Chong sentenced to 20 years' preventive detention
- Deaths: Andy Ang Wei Jie (7)
- Convicted: Sung Peck Imm (39); Chong Keng Chye (36)
- Verdict: Guilty
- Convictions: Multiple charges of child abuse and unrelated cheating offences
- Sentence: Sung – 4 years and 7 months imprisonment Chong – 20 years' preventive detention

On 3 June 1999, seven-year-old Andy Ang Wei Jie (Chinese: 洪伟杰; pinyin: Hóng Wěijíe; Pe̍h-ōe-jī: Âng Úi-kia̍t) collapsed in his home and died due to multiple injuries on his body. Four years later, Ang's mother and her boyfriend-chris were both arrested for murdering him, and it was revealed that the boyfriend, Chong Keng Chye (Chinese: 钟敬财; pinyin: Zhóng Jìngcái; Pe̍h-ōe-jī: Chiong Kèng-châi), had ruthlessly and relentlessly tortured the boy from October 1998 until 3 June 1999, when the boy died.

The mother was sent to jail for four years and seven months on charges of abetting Chong to abuse her son and unrelated cheating offences, and Chong, who had a long criminal record since 1981, was sentenced to the maximum of 20 years' preventive detention with caning for charges of child abuse and cheating. The case of Ang's abuse and death was known to be one of the worst child abuse cases which Singapore had encountered back in the 2000s.

== Death of Andy Ang ==
On 3 June 1999, a seven-year-old boy collapsed from various physical injuries in his flat at Ang Mo Kio. The child, whose name was Andy Ang Wei Jie, was pronounced dead after that. There were numerous injuries and cane marks on the boy's legs and face, suggesting that he had been severely beaten before his death.

Ang's mother Sung Peck Imm, who also had two daughters, made a police report, stated that a few days before, her son, who was the youngest of three children, was taken away by her enstranged husband, with whom she lived in separation since 1992, and she stated that her husband was responsible for the multiple injuries caused to Ang. Ang's father was therefore listed as a suspect behind his son's death. It was further revealed that Ang's father was a fugitive who was wanted for criminal charges by the Singapore Armed Forces and Corrupt Practices Investigation Bureau.

However, Ang's father was living in Thailand at that time, and he was never in the flat or even in Singapore at the time his son died. The case, which was re-classified as death by a rash or negligent act, remained unsolved for the next four years, and Ang's mother and two sisters went missing since.

According to the autopsy report of Dr Teo Eng Swee, who conducted an autopsy on Ang, he found that there were a total of 144 injuries on the body of Ang, including over 100 cane marks all over the body, and burn wounds caused by cigarette marks, fractures to the spine and there were also wounds on the testicles of Ang, who had bleeding in his brain. According to Dr Teo, the mass infection of the wounds resulted in sepsis, and it ultimately led in the death of Ang.

== Arrests and investigations (2003) ==
In August 2003, four years after the death of Andy Ang, the police finally managed to arrest two suspects responsible for his death, and they were Ang's 39-year-old mother Sung Peck Imm and her 36-year-old boyfriend Chong Keng Chye, who were caught at Punggol. In fact, both Sung and Chong were already undergoing investigations for having cheated about S$284,000 from several people. Chong was charged with murder, while Sung was charged with abetment of murder.

It was revealed that since 1981, at the age of 14, Chong had his first run-in with the law for extortion, and since then, for the next 22 years, Chong had been in and out of prison for multiple offences. Chong, who became Sung's boyfriend sometime prior to 1998, moved into Sung's Ang Mo Kio flat in October 1998 and first met Andy Ang and his two sisters.

Details of the boy's abuse were subsequently revealed in court during the trial of the couple. Everyday from October 1998, Chong would slap, kick and hit Ang with a bamboo pole or a feather duster. He not only forced the boy to go around naked at home, but also regularly told the boy to eat his own faeces, and at one point, Chong even dripped hot candle wax on Ang's testicles. Chong also abused Ang's sisters, including one instance when he used a chopper to threaten them. The merciless abuse caused by Chong ultimately resulted in the death of Ang after eight months of undergoing it. All the time, Sung witnessed the abuse which Chong inflicted on her children (especially Ang), but she never intervened as Chong told her that he was doing so only to "cure" the boy, threatened her and even used Sung's low IQ of 80 to persuade her to do his bidding. Chong also refused to seek medical attention on multiple occasions. After the boy died, Chong pretended to be then-Senior Minister Lee Kuan Yew, making a phone call to Sung and told her to provide false evidence to pin the blame on her estranged husband, which Sung complied. Chong himself left the flat due to Sung's persuasion a day before Ang's death.

Five months after Ang died, Sung was roped in to help Chong to commit a series of cheating offences in November 1999, and these were among the charges faced by the duo during earlier investigations before they were finally linked to the murder of Andy Ang. Chong, Sung and a third accomplice had also posed as a few government officials, including then Prime Minister Goh Chok Tong and then Chief Justice Yong Pung How as part of a sophisticated scam masterminded by Chong. Chong and Sung even had two more children while they were on the run for Ang's abuse and murder.

== Court proceedings ==
In February 2004, the charges of murder and abetment of murder against Chong and Sung were reduced to child abuse and abetting child abuse respectively, and aside from the reduced charges, both Chong and Seng also faced multiple fresh charges of cheating.

The couple stood trial on 11 May 2004 at a district court, and District Judge Kow Keng Siong presided the case. Although Andy Ang's name and Sung Peck Imm's name were reported in the media originally, later news reports did not report both of their names to protect the identities of Ang's two surviving sisters, who were said to have been abused by Chong. Leading criminal lawyer Subhas Anandan represented Chong during the trial, while Sung was unrepresented. The couple pleaded guilty during the trial; Chong pleaded guilty to two counts of child abuse and three counts of cheating, with 123 other charges taken into consideration during sentencing, while Sung pleaded guilty to abetting Chong to abuse her son and three other counts of cheating, and had about 93 charges taken into consideration during sentencing.

The prosecution, led by Tan Wen Hsien and James Lee, argued that Chong should be sentenced to the maximum period of 20 years' preventive detention, a special type of imprisonment reserved for recalcitrant offenders above the age of 30 and with at least three antecedents since age 16, and does not allow the possibility of parole even with good behaviour behind bars. They argued that Chong had committed multiple offences since the age of 14 and had been going in and out of prison, and he re-offended by having cheated several people of less than S$300,000, and also maliciously subjecting Ang to an extremely horrific, prolonged and vicious abuse that tragically ended the life of the seven-year-old boy. Citing the heinous nature of the abuse, Chong's criminal records and Chong's high risk of re-offending, the prosecutors therefore urged the court to have Chong locked away as long as permissible under the law to safeguard the interests of society. Anandan, who submitted a mitigation plea on behalf of Chong, stated that Chong had gone overboard for disciplining the children and led to the tragedy to occur and asked that the sentence should be shorter than the prosecution's submissions, but he also accepted and conceded that there was no justification Chong could raise for having caused Ang's death and having abused him and his sisters.

On the same date of the trial, for the charges of abetting child abuse, making a false report to police and cheating, 40-year-old Sung Peck Imm was sentenced to four years and seven months' (or 55 months) imprisonment in view of her low IQ of 80, which made her vulnerable to being manipulated by Chong to abuse her children. Chong's sentencing was scheduled three weeks later after the judge ordered a report to be made to assess whether Chong was suitable for preventive detention.

On 1 June 2004, nearly five years after Ang died, District Judge Kow Keng Siong delivered his verdict. District Judge Kow stated that he cannot "fathom what sort of depravity and peversity to motivate someone to torture a young boy in such a gratuitous manner", citing especially that Chong had dripped hot candle wax on Ang's testicles, and described the abuse as "inhumane and degrading" and the plight of Ang as "heart-wrenching" due to the horrific abuse and 144 injuries on his body. He minced no words and admonished Chong for his lack of remorse and his "sadistic and violent streak", which District Judge Kow noted as the reason why Chong should stay behind bars for a long time. He also referred to a government psychiatrist's report that Chong was not suffering from an abnormality of the mind and he failed to empathize with the victims and tend to downplay his conduct. District Judge Kow noted that Chong had also manipulated Sung into abusing her son by exploiting her low intelligence for the sake of soliciting his "unbridled acts of violence", and finally, in view of Chong's criminal record and nature of his latest offences, District Judge Kow concluded that Chong had a "clear disregard for authority and the law" and had a "insatiable thirst for violence and greed", and in addition to Chong's low education, lack of marketable skills and inability to secure stable employment, which could potentially lead to him re-offending upon his release from prison.

Therefore, District Judge Kow decided that preventive detention should be imposed to isolate Chong from society for the maximum period possible to protect the public at large, and thus sentenced 36-year-old Chong Keng Chye to 20 years' preventive detention. District Judge Kow also imposed nine strokes of the cane on Chong for his acts of dripping hot candle wax on Ang's testicles; Chong was originally supposed to receive 12 strokes but it was reduced to nine due to Chong having pleaded guilty to the charges.

== Aftermath ==
Singaporean crime show True Files re-enacted the murder of Andy Ang and aired it as the fifth episode of the show's third season on 22 November 2004. Chong's former lawyer Subhas Anandan agreed to be interviewed on the show, and he stated that he was personally disturbed and horrified at the injuries suffered by Andy Ang and sympathize with the boy's plight, and he questioned his client's purpose of using excessive violence on the boy, even if accepting that Chong only did so out of discipline. Dr Teo Eng Swee, the forensic pathologist, similarly told the producers of the show that he was saddened and shocked at the extent of abuse which Ang had suffered for the last eight months of his life before he died, and also explained the cause of Ang's death. Ang was renamed Kelvin while his mother was renamed Susan to protect their identities, while Chong Keng Chye still retained his real name in the episode.

In 2011, the case was re-enacted by Singaporean crime show In Cold Blood, and the names of the victim and offenders were changed to protect their identities and for dramatic purposes; Ang was renamed Wee Kiong, Sung was renamed as Mei Lin and Chong himself was renamed as Choon Seng.

During the time of Chong's imprisonment, between September 2015 and March 2016, a prison officer sought bribes from Chong on eight occasions, after the officer promised to help him get transferred out from the maximum-security section of Changi Prison to another section. While it is not known if Chong faced any charges for having done so, the officer Kobi Krishna Ayavoo was subsequently brought to trial in January 2020, and found guilty of receiving bribes of S$133,000 in November 2023, and sentenced in February 2024 to serve three years and two weeks in prison. Kobi's junior colleague Firoz Khan Shaik Fazaluddin was fined S$4000 in 2018 for trying to help Kobi to illegally access Chong's inmate number and data from the prison computer system as part of Kobi's schemes.

== See also ==
- Caning in Singapore
- List of major crimes in Singapore
