= Quek Loo Ming case =

2001 case of a man charged with committing murder by poisoning

Quek Loo Ming
- 2002 police mugshot of Quek Loo Ming
- Born: Quek Loo Ming; 1 June 1945 (age 81); Japanese occupation of Singapore
- Occupation: Laboratory officer (former)
- Spouse: Unnamed wife
- Children: 1+
- Status: Released
- Motive: To seek revenge
- Convictions: Culpable homicide not amounting to murder (one count); Voluntarily causing grievous hurt by dangerous means (one count)
- Criminal charges: Murder (one count); Voluntarily causing grievous hurt by dangerous means (two counts)
- Penalty: 15 years' imprisonment

On 31 December 2001, while volunteering at an end-of-year event, 56-year-old Quek Loo Ming (Chinese: 郭禄明; Pe̍h-ōe-jī: Koeh Lo̍k-bêng; pinyin: Guō Lùmíng), a retired laboratory officer, spiked a bottle of water with methomyl and offered it to the chairperson of a resident's committee in Bukit Timah, Singapore, hoping that the chairperson, who Quek considered had mistreated him, would drink it and suffer from diarrhoea. However, the chairperson did not drink it; three other volunteers of the event drank it and had to be hospitalized. One of the three victims, 62-year-old Fong Oi Lin, died of poisoning on 3 January 2002; the other two – 66-year-old Richard Ho Sin Shong and 38-year-old Wong Ah Kim – were in critical condition, but recovered and survived. Quek was later arrested and charged with murdering Fong and causing grievous hurt to Wong and Ho; the charge of murder in Quek's case was downgraded to manslaughter. Quek was found guilty and sentenced to nine years of imprisonment for manslaughter and inflicting grievous injury. Upon the prosecution's appeal, Quek's sentence was increased to 15 years' imprisonment.

== Background ==
Born in 1945, Quek Loo Ming went to the University of Singapore (now the National University of Singapore) and attained a Bachelor of Science degree after his graduation. Some time after completing his university degree and during his adulthood years, Quek worked as a laboratory officer and forensic scientist at the Toxicology Laboratory of the Department of Scientific Services (DSS), before its merger with Department of Forensic Medicine (DFM) to form the Institute of Forensic Science (IFS). Quek worked for 12 years at the IFS before he retired in June 2000 upon reaching 55 years of age. He went on to work as a volunteer member of a resident's committee at Bukit Timah. Other sources reported that Quek also worked as an acupuncturist. He was known to many as a pleasant and polite man who diligently helped out in volunteering activities.

During his adulthood years, Quek was married with at least one daughter.

== Murder of Fong Oi Lin ==
Fong Oi Lin, the 62-year-old tea lady who died four days after the poisoning.

On 31 December 2001, Quek Loo Ming was one of the volunteers at an end-of-year event organized by the resident's committee. According to Quek, he was unhappy with the committee's 49-year-old chairperson Doreen Lum (Chinese: 林丽卿; Jyutping: Lam4 Lai6 Hing1; pinyin: Lín Lìqìng). Quek considered that Lum mistreated him, treating him like an "errand boy" and never giving him credit for his volunteering work. That afternoon Lum ordered Quek to buy 20 packets of chicken rice for the volunteers; Quek did so, but was aggrieved by being given the task at extremely short notice; for that, together with his previous issues with Lum, Quek decided to seek revenge and teach Lum a lesson.

According to Quek's testimony to his lawyers and police, he had handled the case of a Filipino maid's death while he was still a laboratory officer at DSS; she had committed suicide by drinking a large dose of methomyl mixed into her coffee. Methomyl is a strong poison used for pesticides, and a large dose could kill, while a smaller dose will affect the nervous system and cause muscular paralysis. Quek, who had obtained the poison from his workplace some time before his retirement, returned home and filled an empty mineral water bottle with water and a tablespoon of powdered methomyl. He offered the contaminated water to Lum, hoping it would give her diarrhoea; however, Lum did not drink it.

Three other people present at the event drank the contaminated water while eating satays and other foods at the event; they fell gravely ill and became unconscious, and were rushed to the National University Hospital for treatment, where they remained in critical condition. On 3 January 2002, one of them, 62-year-old Fong Oi Lin (Chinese: 冯爱莲; Jyutping: Fung4 Oi3 Lin4; pinyin: Féng Aìlián; 1940 – 3 January 2002), a tea lady and a volunteer at the event, died from the poison. The other two people, 66-year-old retired accountant and vice-president of the resident's committee Richard Ho Sin Shong (何常胜 Hé Chángshèng) and 38-year-old electrician Wong Ah Kim (黄亚金; Vòng A-kîm; Huáng Yájīn), spent weeks at the hospital recovering, and survived. The contaminated water was disposed of by Fong before she fell ill because she found it smelly, so nobody else drank any. Fong was survived by her husband, a 34-year-old daughter, and two sons.

== Arrest and charges ==
On 10 January 2002, a week after Fong Oi Lin died, 56-year-old Quek Loo Ming was arrested at his Clementi flat after the police investigators found evidence linking Quek to the poisoning. It was initially thought by police that the satays eaten by the three victims had been poisoned, before it was determined that Quek had poisoned the bottle of water.

Quek expressed remorse for the death of Fong Oi Lin, and told police that he meant no harm to Fong, Richard Ho, or Wong Ah Kim, but only wanted to go after Doreen Lum for how she treated him. Lum denied in a press interview that she had any personal issues with Quek. The arrest of Quek was shocking to Fong's family, as Quek had attended her funeral and taken part in the preparations for her wake.

On 11 January 2002, the day after his arrest, Quek was charged with Fong's murder by methomyl. Under Singapore law conviction for murder is punishable by death. On 18 January 2002, Quek returned to court to be charged with two further counts, of voluntarily causing grievous hurt by dangerous means for injuring Wong and Ho.

== Trial of Quek Loo Ming ==
=== Plea of guilt ===
The trial of Quek Loo Ming began at the High Court on 2 August 2002. The proceeding was presided by Judicial Commissioner Choo Han Teck. Quek was represented by Singapore's top criminal lawyer Subhas Anandan and Anandan's nephew Anand Nalachandran. The prosecution was led by Ong Hian Sun and Jason Tan from the Attorney-General's Chambers (AGC).

Before the start of Quek's trial, Anandan made representations to the AGC to lower the murder charge as part of a plea bargain, and the prosecution eventually agreed to amend the murder charge to one of culpable homicide not amounting to murder, the equivalent of manslaughter in Singapore law and not subject to the death penalty; he also expressed his intention to plead guilty to all the charges against him. The maximum penalty for either of the charges was life imprisonment.

Upon Quek's plea of guilt, he was convicted of one count of manslaughter and one count of causing grievous hurt, and consented to have the second charge of causing grievous hurt to be taken into consideration during sentencing. The prosecution argued for Quek to be sentenced to the maximum sentence of life imprisonment, or at least a jail term of more than ten years, due to the harm caused to the victims and the death of Fong, and for deterrence, and to appease the outrage of the community's feelings.

After the landmark appeal of Abdul Nasir Amer Hamsah on 20 August 1997, an offender sentenced to life imprisonment would remain in jail for the remainder of their natural lifespan, instead of following the previous interpretation of life imprisonment as 20 years' jail, so Quek could have been imprisoned for the rest of his life.

=== Sentence ===
On 5 August 2002, Judicial Commissioner Choo sentenced Quek. The judge found that Quek should not be sentenced to life imprisonment, saying that while age should not prevent courts from delivering life sentences, there were extenuating circumstances, Quek was a first offender with an "unblemished record" and had contributed to society during his work for the government, and was genuinely remorseful. However, Choo dismissed the defence's argument that the victims were not Quek's target(s) as a mitigating factor.

Judicial Commissioner Choo handed down a jail term of nine years for the first charge of manslaughter, and a second, concurrent, jail term of three years for one of the two counts of voluntarily causing grievous hurt. Although caning was warranted for both of Quek's offences, he was not caned as he was more than 50 years old.

On being told about Quek's sentencing, Doreen Lum told the newspapers that she had forgiven Quek for attempting to harm her, and had hoped he would not be sentenced to death. Quek's wife publicly apologized to Fong's bereaved kin and the other two victims and their families for her husband's crime.

== Prosecution's appeal ==
=== Hearing ===
Soon after Quek Loo Ming's sentencing, the prosecution appealed against the methomyl killer's sentence of nine years' imprisonment, on the grounds that the sentence was manifestly inadequate. The appeal was heard before a three-judge panel of the Court of Appeal, the highest court of the nation.

Seeking a sentence of more than nine years, the prosecution argued that Quek's actions of poisoning the water were not done out of impulse, and it demonstrated a high level of premeditation on his part. They argued that the clean record of Quek carried little weight in view of the combination of aggravating factors in the methomyl poisoning case, and said that the emphasis of sentence should be placed on deterrence and retribution.

The prosecution also said that if Quek had really been remorseful he would have immediately provided doctors with information about the poison and assisted them to treat his victims at an earlier stage. They also pointed out that Quek did not give himself up to the police, but was arrested only after investigations linked him to the poisoning.

=== Appeal ruling ===
On 21 October 2002, the Court of Appeal's three judges—Chief Justice Yong Pung How, High Court judge Tan Lee Meng and Judge of Appeal Chao Hick Tin—ruled that Quek's jail term of nine years was manifestly inadequate, and would send a wrong signal regarding the punishment for cases of death by poisoning. They said that the poisoning was not done by a layman, but by a former laboratory officer who knew that methomyl was an extremely potent poison. Quek had "acted with complete disregard for the lives and safety of others". The Court of Appeal sentenced Quek to ten years in prison for the first count of manslaughter, and another, consecutive, five years in prison for the second count of inflicting grievous hurt.

== Imprisonment and aftermath ==
Quek was imprisoned at Changi Prison for fifteen years, eligible for parole after two-thirds of his sentence. Quek and two other acupuncturists in separate criminal cases were disqualified from practice as acupuncturists. In 2017 Quek had been released from prison, and it was presumed that he and his wife had emigrated to another country.

In November 2002, one month after the prosecution's appeal in Quek's case, Singaporean crime show Crimewatch made a television program about the case of Quek Loo Ming.

Quek's case was recorded in the autobiography of his former lawyer Subhas Anandan, titled The Best I Could, which was first published in 2009. Anandan wrote that when he first met Quek, he noted that Quek was truly remorseful for murdering Fong and causing great suffering to Ho and Wong although he had only wanted to go after Doreen Lum. He described Quek as a "very foolish man who took offence at petty things". In addition, Anandan stated he respected Quek's wife as a remarkable woman who calmly supported her husband throughout the proceedings. As a result of the case, Quek's wife was forced to leave their Clementi flat and move to another neighbourhood. At the time of writing, Quek's wife planned to leave Singapore and emigrate to another country, with her husband to join her upon his release.

Five years later, Anandan's book was the basis for a two-season television series with the same title. The case of Quek Loo Ming was re-adapted and aired as the ninth episode of the show's second season.

In 2013, crime show In Cold Blood re-enacted the case in the eighth episode of the show's third season.

Liz Porter, a crime writer from Australia, included Quek Loo Ming's case in her book Crime Scene Asia: When Forensic Evidence Becomes the Silent Witness. The book was about murder cases from Asia that were solved through forensic evidence; these recorded cases came from Asian countries such as Singapore, Malaysia and Hong Kong.

The case of Quek Loo Ming was one of the high-profile incidents that made headlines in Singapore in 2002.

== See also ==
- Life imprisonment in Singapore
- Capital punishment in Singapore
- List of major crimes in Singapore
