= Murder of Wan Cheon Kem =

2006 armed robbery and murder of a lorry driver in Singapore

Wan Cheon Kem
- Born: Wan Cheon Kem; 1960; Colony of Singapore
- Died: 5 June 2006 (aged 46); Changi General Hospital, Singapore
- Cause of death: Murdered
- Other name: Wan Cheon Kern
- Occupation: Lorry driver
- Employer: Sterling Agencies
- Known for: Murder victim

On 30 May 2006, 46-year-old lorry driver Wan Cheon Kem (Chinese: 温长俭; Jyutping: Wan1 Zoeng2 Gim6; pinyin: Wēn Chángjiăn), who was delivering 2,700 mobile phones (worth S$1.3 million), was attacked by three armed robbers who robbed him of the phones and assaulted him by bludgeoning him on the head at least 15 times with a baseball bat, leading to his death during his hospitalization six days later. The handphone heist, which occurred at Changi Coast Road, was masterminded by Arsan Krishnasamy Govindarajoo, who was informed of Wan's delivery task by Wan's colleague Ragu Ramajayam (who assisted Arsan and the three robbers in planning the robbery).

The three armed robbers and Arsan were charged with murder, while Ragu was charged with abetting the robbery. Ragu and Arsan were jailed and caned for robbery with hurt, while the trio - Nakamuthu Balakrishnan, Daniel Vijay Katherasan and Christopher Samson Anpalagan - who were responsible for Wan's death, were found guilty of murder and sentenced to death. On appeal, Christopher and Daniel had their death sentences commuted to jail terms of 15 years each (in addition to caning) for amended charges of robbery with hurt, while Balakrishnan, who waived his right to appeal, had his death sentence upheld and was eventually hanged for murder.

== Armed robbery and murder ==
On 30 May 2006, 46-year-old Wan Cheon Kem, a lorry driver, received an assignment of delivering 2,700 mobile phones (worth S$1.3 million) on behalf of his company. When he was driving on Changi Coast Road, he was attacked by three robbers who stole the handphones.

Wan was eventually found slumped on the dashboard of his parked lorry at Pasir Ris Park. Wan's skull was shattered, and he had an eight-hour operation to remove the broken bone pieces from his head. Wan remained unconscious and died on 5 June 2006 at Changi General Hospital. The forensic pathologist, Dr Teo Eng Swee, found that the skull fractures were caused by blunt force trauma, and at least 15 blows had been inflicted. The severity of the fractures suggested that a huge amount of force was exerted when the attackers struck Wan on the head. According to the pathologist, the fractures and the resulting intracranial hemorrhage were sufficient to lead to Wan's death.

At the time of his death, Wan was single and was survived by his elderly mother (aged in her 70s as of 2006) and four siblings. He lived in the same Pasir Ris flat as his mother and younger sister. According to Wan's 48-year-old older brother Richard Wan, Wan Cheon Kem never drank or smoked and had worked for more than a decade as a lorry driver.

== Arrest and charges ==
Within days after the handphone heist, the police arrested one of the three robbers, as well as two other men who planned the crime and at least five other individuals who allegedly received the stolen handphones and sold them. Wan's remaining two attackers surrendered themselves about a week after the murder.

Police investigations said that the primary mastermind was 38-year-old Arsan Krishnasamy Govindarajoo, who collaborated with one of Wan's colleagues to plan the robbery. The colleague and secondary mastermind, 36-year-old Ragu Ramajayam, was the one who informed Arsan about Wan's task of delivering the phones that allowed Arsan to plan the robbery and recruit the three others.

After Wan's death, the handphone heist case was re-classified as murder. On 6 June 2006, 23-year-old Daniel Vijay Katherasan and 23-year-old Christopher Samson Anpalagan, who were both involved in the fatal assault and robbery of Wan, became the first two suspects to be charged with murder. The third robber, 48-year-old Nakamuthu Balakrishnan, had his original charge of armed robbery with hurt amended to murder on 9 June 2006. Arsan, who masterminded the heist, was also charged with murder on the same day as Balakrishnan. Wan's colleague Ragu was charged with abetting armed robbery with hurt. Daniel and Christopher were both revealed to be wanted by the authorities for desertion of their National Service (NS) duties prior to murdering Wan.

The suspects who received and sold the stolen handphones were prosecuted and jailed for dishonestly receiving stolen property (ranging from three to five months' jail). Among the stolen 2,700 mobile phones, only 2,158 were recovered by the police.

== Before trial ==
Ragu pleaded guilty to his role of abetting the armed robbery and assault, and on 24 April 2007, he was sentenced to six years' imprisonment and 12 strokes of the cane by District Judge See Kee Oon, who took into consideration the robbery outcome that led to Wan's death, the position of trust on Ragu's part, and the high value of the cargo stolen during the heist. Later, Ragu appealed for his sentence to be reduced, and his sentence was lowered to 4 1/2 years in jail and six strokes of the cane by the High Court.

Before the start of the trial, Arsan had his murder charge reduced to abetting armed robbery with hurt. On 2 July 2007, Arsan was found guilty of this lesser charge and a few other charges, and he was later sentenced to 16 1/2 years' imprisonment and 24 strokes of the cane. Arsan did not appeal his sentence. During sentencing, Justice Lee Seiu Kin of the High Court stated that for having solicited the trio to commit armed robbery and ordered them to resort to violence and knock Wan unconscious, Arsan should bear some responsibility for having indirectly caused Wan to die from the cruel attack.

== Murder trial ==
=== Trial hearing ===
On 22 October 2007, the robbery trio - Christopher Samson Anpalagan, Daniel Vijay Katherasan and Nakamuthu Balakrishnan - stood trial at the High Court for one count of murdering 46-year-old Wan Cheon Kem. The trial was presided by Justice Tay Yong Kwang of the High Court. Christopher was represented by Subhas Anandan and Sunil Sudheesan; Daniel was represented by K Jayakumar Naidu and Singa Retnam; Balakrishnan was represented by Allagarsamy Palaniyappan and Mohamed Muzammil bin Mohamed. The prosecution consisted of Amarjit Singh, Lee Cheow Han and Stanley Kok Pin Chin.

Daniel, who first took the stand, admitted that he was involved in committing the robbery but denied killing Wan. Daniel said that he was recruited by Balakrishnan to join the robbery and he agreed to due to his financial troubles. Daniel testified that the original plan was to simply steal the lorry while Wan made his stop at the pass-office, but the plan failed since Wan did not make the stopover as they predicted, and hence, Daniel and the other two thus tailed Wan's vehicle, overtook it and led to both their vehicles coming to a stop on the road. Daniel stated he saw Balakrishnan and Christopher alighting the lorry, with Balakrishnan brandishing the baseball bat and used it to assault Wan. Daniel stated he was shocked at the violence unleashed by Balakrishnan, and stated he never partake in the assault and only wanted to rob, not to kill Wan.

Christopher, who became the next to put up his defence, testified that he was recruited at the last minute by Balakrishnan and Daniel, as their replacement driver of the get-away lorry after one of the accomplices, who was supposed to join in the plan, was absent. Christopher stated that while he had the intent to commit armed robbery, he only acted as the driver and had never intended to commit murder. Like Daniel, Christopher did not join in the fatal assault of Wan.

As the final defendant to go to the stand, Balakrishnan admitted that he had used the baseball bat to bludgeon the lorry driver on the head during the robbery, and his defence was that there was no intention to commit murder and to cause the death of the victim as the plan was to rob the victim of the 2,700 handphones. Balakrishnan additionally asserted that when he confronted Wan, the lorry driver talked to him with abusive language and expletives, insulting Balakrishnan's mother and thus, it deeply provoked Balakrishnan into hitting Wan with the baseball bat out of anger, and this were also inflicted during a sudden fight between Balakrishnan and Wan as sparked by Wan's insults.

=== Judgement ===
On 19 March 2008, Justice Tay Yong Kwang delivered his verdict. He found in his verdict that Balakrishnan had intentionally inflicted injuries which were sufficient to cause death in the ordinary course of nature, and noted that under Section 300(c) of the Penal Code, an offence of intentionally inflicting fatal injuries to a victim was also considered as murder, even if there was no intention to kill. Also, Justice Tay rejected Balakrishnan's contention that Wan had insulted him and resulted in Balakrishnan killing Wan under sudden and grave provocation, since Wan, as the victim of a robbery, was not the aggressor and none of Balakrishnan's accomplices testified that Wan had insulted Balakrishnan before the assault, and since Wan was knocked out before the attack, the defence of sudden fight did not apply as well.

The judge also stated that Balakrishnan's decision to bring the baseball bat also led to the inference that Balakrishnan had premeditated the assault and knew that he would use it during the robbery, and had used it to cause fatal injuries on Wan, killing the 46-year-old lorry driver. Justice Tay further found that Balakrishnan did so in furtherance of the trio's common intention to commit armed robbery, even though Christopher and Daniel did not take part in the fatal assault, since there was pre-knowledge shared by the trio that violence was necessary during the commission of the robbery to achieve their goal, which rendered Daniel and Christopher liable for a conviction of murder by common intention as well.

Therefore, Justice Tay found the trio guilty of murder, and sentenced them to death. Back in 2008, the death penalty was prescribed as the mandatory sentence for murder under Section 302 of the Penal Code.

== Appeal process ==
=== Appeal hearing and withdrawal of Balakrishnan's appeal ===
While the trio were incarcerated on death row at Changi Prison, the Court of Appeal heard the three condemned men's appeals against their conviction for the murder of Wan Cheon Kem. However, during the hearing, Balakrishnan decided to waive his right to appeal, and although his appeal was subsequently withdrawn, the Court of Appeal still reviewed Balakrishnan's case to determine if his murder conviction should stand, and they also wanted to assess the roles of both Daniel and Christopher (who also tried to back out of the appeal) to see if they should be convicted of murder despite not being the ones directly beating Wan to death.

=== Reprieve of Daniel and Christopher ===
On 3 September 2010, the Court of Appeal's three judges - Chief Justice Chan Sek Keong, Judge of Appeal V. K. Rajah and High Court judge Choo Han Teck - delivered their ruling. They unanimously found that both Daniel and Christopher should not be convicted of murder, because although they shared the common intention with Balakrishnan to commit armed robbery, they never shared the intention with Balakrishnan to inflict the fatal injuries on Wan, much less causing the lorry driver to die. They clarified on the application of the doctrine of common intention, stating that in the context of Wan's murder, the knowledge of Daniel and Christopher that violence was necessary did not equate to intention to resort to violence and in turn cause Wan to die. They also verified that only by sharing the common intention with the actual perpetrator to commit an act, the accomplice(s) would be considered to have acted and committed the said crime through the same common intention.

On the other hand, the Court of Appeal found there was sufficient evidence to prove Balakrishnan guilty of murder, since by his own admission, he had intentionally bludgeoned Wan on the head and as a result, the head injuries caused by Balakrishnan were sufficient to cause death in the ordinary course of nature, rendering Balakrishnan liable for a conviction of murder under Section 300(c) of the Penal Code.

As a result, the Court of Appeal set aside the death sentences and murder convictions of both Christopher Samson Anpalagan and Daniel Vijay Katherasan, and instead convicted them of lesser charges of armed robbery with hurt, enabling both Daniel and Christopher to ultimately escape the gallows for murdering Wan. With respect to Balakrishnan's case, the Court of Appeal upheld his murder conviction and death sentence. The verdict of the appellate court was also significant as it led to a revision of the legal doctrine of common intention required to convict an accomplice for murder or other offences committed by the main perpetrator(s) of whichever case.

=== Re-sentencing of Daniel and Christopher ===
After their conviction for armed robbery with hurt, Daniel and Christopher had their cases remitted back to the High Court for re-sentencing before the original trial judge Tay Yong Kwang. During the hearing, the prosecution submitted that the sentences of the duo should not be a lower penalty than Arsan's sentence of 16 1/2 years' imprisonment and 24 strokes of the cane, due to the violent nature of the crime and the need for deterrence of similar offences in the nature. Under Singapore law, the punishment for robbery with hurt was between five and 20 years of imprisonment, and caning between 12 and 24 strokes.

In his mitigation plea, Daniel stated he was married with three children (aged ten, nine and six) and he was the sole breadwinner of his family, and he went AWOL from his NS duties due to him doing odd jobs to support his family and resolving his precarious financial situation, and it was why he joined the robbery. Daniel expressed remorse for having participated in the robbery and indirectly causing Wan's death. It was highlighted by Daniel's lawyers that he never took part in the assault, and that he played a smaller role than Balakrishnan and Arsan in the crime, hence his sentence should be lower than even Arsan's jail term of 16 years and six months. It was cited that Daniel was previously convicted twice for traffic offences, one in February 2003 and another in March 2005; on both occasions, he was fined S$1,000, but for his second offence, Daniel did not pay the fine and hence served 10 days' imprisonment in default.

As for Christopher, he had no criminal record, but in his mitigation plea, Christopher, who was only educated up to N-levels, stated that he deserted from his military service since 2004 due to him having to work as a daily-rated driver to support his family and alleviate their poor financial situation. He said he was the only son in his family and was living with his parents. His father, a pastor, was diagnosed with a stroke while his mother worked as a production operator in a factory. Christopher's counsel also stated that their client surrendered to the authorities and had cooperated with the police, and he was similarly remorseful for his criminal conduct and had never expected Wan to die due to Balakrishnan's actions, which were not within Christopher's contemplations. Since his role was comparatively smaller than the mastermind Arsan, Christopher asked through his counsel for a lower sentence than that of Arsan in his case.

On 4 October 2010, Daniel and Christopher were each sentenced to 15 years' imprisonment and 15 strokes of the cane. Justice Tay stated he was sympathetic for the financial struggles the duo faced which spurred them into joining the robbery heist, but he did not neglect the aggravating factors of the case, stating that per the prosecution's arguments, the nature of the crime was violent and the sentence should serve as a deterrent and also a reminder to potential like-minded offenders on the legal consequences they would face for resorting to crime as the easy solution to resolve their monetary hardships. The jail terms were backdated to 5 June 2006, the date when both Christopher and Daniel were caught.

The duo's appeals to reduce their sentences were turned down by the Court of Appeal on 27 April 2011.

== Fate of Balakrishnan and aftermath ==
After giving up his appeal and with his death sentence upheld, Nakamuthu Balakrishnan was the sole person out of the main perpetrators to remain on death row for the conviction of murdering Wan Cheon Kem.

On 22 July 2011, the obituary of Nakamuthu Balakrishnan was published on The Straits Times, revealing that his date of death was 8 July 2011. The cause of death, while not revealed in the obituary, was execution by hanging.

In July 2011, the same month when Balakrishnan died, the government of Singapore began to review its existing death penalty laws and imposed a moratorium on all 35 pending death sentences (28 for drug trafficking and seven for murder) in Singapore, making Balakrishnan likely one of the four people to be executed in Singapore in the year 2011 before the moratorium. Balakrishnan was the last person put to death in Singapore prior to the moratorium; the authorities also confirmed that the last execution before the moratorium was carried out in July 2011 when the media covered the double hangings of Tang Hai Liang and Foong Chee Peng on 18 July 2014.

The capital punishment review lasted for one year until July 2012, when the Singapore government passed the changes to the laws, allowing judges in Singapore to have the discretion to impose life imprisonment with caning for murder offences lacking the intent to cause death and drug trafficking offences committed by small-level traffickers who either acted as couriers or suffered from diminished responsibility. These changes were made effective in January 2013, enabling several high-profile criminals like Yong Vui Kong and Cheong Chun Yin to have their death sentences commuted to life sentences with caning.

== See also ==
- Caning in Singapore
- Capital punishment in Singapore
