= Subhas Anandan =

Singaporean criminal lawyer (1947–2015)

- Anandan in 2011
- Born: 25 December 1947; Dominion of India
- Died: 7 January 2015 (aged 67); Singapore
- Other name: "The Basher"
- Education: Raffles Institution; University of Singapore
- Occupation: Lawyer

Subhas Anandan (25 December 1947 – 7 January 2015) was a Singaporean criminal lawyer, who was known to have represented criminals in many high-profile cases that occurred in Singapore.

At the time of his death, Anandan was the senior partner in law firm RHTLaw Taylor Wessing LLP and headed its department in criminal law. He was a founding member and the first president of the Association of Criminal Lawyers of Singapore. He was also the president of Cuesports Singapore, the national sports association for billiards, snooker, and pool. Towards the end of his life, Anandan's health began to deteriorate and he died of heart failure in January 2015.

== Early life ==
Anandan was born in post-British Raj on 25 December 1947 to Raman Anandan and Govindan Pushpanjaly in Travancore-Cochin (now Kerala, India). When he was five months old, the family migrated from India to Singapore, where his father had found work as a clerk in the British Royal Navy. They lived in the staff quarters within the British naval base in Sembawang until his father retired in the early 1970s.

Anandan attended primary and secondary school in the naval base, first at Admiralty Asian School and then Naval Base School, where he excelled academically. In 1963, after achieving a first grade in his Senior Cambridge (now 'O' Level) examinations, he went back to India to study medicine in Madras (now Chennai) under the request of his mother. But after the first few lessons, he was convinced that he was not meant to be a doctor. He returned home after three months and started his pre-university education at Raffles Institution in 1964.

After completing his Higher School Certificate (now 'A' Level) examinations, he wanted to join the police force but eventually enrolled in the University of Singapore (now National University of Singapore) at the insistence of his father. While pursuing a degree in law, he participated in various extra-curricular activities, including playing on the university's football team and serving as secretary-general of the Socialists' Club. In law school, he was a classmate of Lawrence Ang, who would become a future deputy public prosecutor in Singapore. He obtained his law degree in 1970 and went on to become the protégé of Chan Sek Keong, then a senior partner at law firm Shook Lin & Bok and, later, a Chief Justice of Singapore.

== Later years and career ==
According to Anandan, his first murder case was in 1972, when he represented a man nicknamed "Tampines Rajah", who was sentenced to hang for murdering a man nicknamed "Beatles Rajah"; the defendant, who was a known acquaintance of Anandan, had encouraged him to continue defending others and this led to Anandan continuing to defend suspects in capital cases throughout his 45-year-long legal career.

In March 1976, Anandan was arrested by the police for suspected involvement in a secret society under the Criminal Law (Temporary Provisions) Act. He was released from remand and exonerated in November of the same year following an investigation by the Corrupt Practices Investigation Bureau.

Anandan started the Association of Criminal Lawyers of Singapore in 2002, with the goal of raising the number of criminal lawyers in the country. In 2011, Anandan, alongside law practitioners including Rajan Menon, founded RHTLaw TaylorWessing and stayed on as one of its senior partners until his death.

Anandan had started his practice handling mainly civil, accident and family cases but soon began gravitating towards criminal law. In his lifetime, he had handled over a thousand criminal cases involving a wide range of crimes, including murder, rape, domestic worker abuse, drug trafficking and white-collar offences. Known for his sharp and stinging attacks in the courtroom, he was nicknamed "the Basher" within the law community. His presence in court had been characterised as intimidating, given his fierce stares and voluminous beard. As one of Singapore's top criminal defence lawyers, he had appeared so frequently in the media that some people called him a "publicity hound".

While Anandan was critical of some aspects of the criminal justice system in Singapore, he believed that the system had to be followed. He also had a personal mantra of "the most heinous offenders deserve their day in a court of law"; hence Anandan had claimed to have never rejected cases because of the offence the person had been charged with.

In 2013, Anandan was part of the 12-member steering committee to guide the development of the Singapore University of Social Sciences School of Law.

== Personal life and death ==
Anandan, who was formerly a stateless person, first applied for Singapore citizenship in 1972, but was informed a decade later that his application had been turned down. He tried again 2002, and was then finally granted citizenship.

Subhas Anandan was married to Vimala Kesavan. The couple had a son, Sujesh Anandan (born in 1990 or 1991), who also became a lawyer like his father. Sujesh was reportedly called to the Bar in early 2019. Anandan's nephew Sunil Sudheesan is also a lawyer.

Anandan's brother Surash was a football player and later worked as a flight attendant with Singapore Airlines. On 31 October 2000, he was killed along with 82 other passengers and crew in the crash of Singapore Airlines Flight 006 at Chiang Kai-shek International Airport in Taipei, Taiwan. Surash was coincidentally a former colleague of Constance Chee Cheong Hin, a air stewardess charged with killing a four-year-old girl, and Anandan happened to defend Chee during her trial.

According to Anandan's book, The Best I Could, former Solicitor-General Francis Seow owed Anandan S$25,000 since the 1980s, after Seow left the country when faced with income tax charges.

Anandan was particularly passionate about big-capacity cars. He developed this liking in his secondary school days, when he saw other students driving or being driven around in luxury cars like Mercedes Benzes and Jaguars. Beside owning luxury cars, he liked collecting antique or miniature swords, sabres and kris. He often went to the Singapore Cricket Club to play snooker and billiards as a means of releasing work-induced stress. He also spent most of his time at the Holy Tree Sri Balasubramaniar Temple, where he was the chairman of its board of trustees.

An active sportsman in his youth, Anandan was taking 22 types of medication every day because of his deteriorating health in the later years up to his death. He had three heart attacks, and had also undergone a heart bypass and an angioplasty. He had also lost one kidney to cancer and was a diabetic.

At around 2300 hours (GMT+8) on 7 January 2015, Anandan died while hospitalised at Singapore General Hospital of complications from heart failure, which he was diagnosed with in 2014. His death triggered an outpouring of grief especially amongst members of the law industry in Singapore. Law Minister K. Shanmugam hailed Anandan as a "titan in criminal law" as well as a "legal legend", while Attorney-General V. K. Rajah lauded his "uncanny legal acumen". His funeral, which was attended by "hundreds", was held the next evening and Anandan's body was cremated with Hindu rites on the same day.

== Legacy ==
Anandan was awarded the Legal Eagle Award of 2001 conferred by the Law Society of Singapore.

Anandan was honoured by the Association of Muslim Lawyers on 28 October 2014 for his substantial contributions towards the legal profession and being a champion of pro bono work for several decades. A tribute ceremony was held at the Supreme Court Auditorium and attended by some 400 members of the legal community, including Law Minister K. Shanmugam, former President S. R. Nathan, Attorney-General V. K. Rajah and several judges. At the ceremony, the newly formed "Yellow Ribbon Fund Subhas Anandan Star Bursary Award" worth S$250,000 was launched which would provide financial support to ex-inmates who wished to pursue further education and a second chance in society, a cause pioneered by Anandan during his four-decade career. Anandan's 2009 book, The Best I Could, documenting his more famous cases, was adapted into a Channel 5 television series of the same name. It ran for two seasons. Anandan's second book, It's Easy To Cry, was posthumously published on 15 September 2015.

== Former cases ==
During his career, starting from 1970 until his death in 2015, Anandan had appeared in numerous notable cases, especially those which involved the death penalty or cases of aggravated murder which shocked the nation of Singapore, like those of Anthony Ler who manipulated and instigated a 15-year-old boy to kill his estranged wife in 2001; Took Leng How, who murdered Huang Na in 2004; robber and kidnapper Abdul Nasir bin Amer Hamsah; former air hostess Constance Chee Cheong Hin who killed a four-year-old girl; Tan Chor Jin, who shot a nightclub owner in Serangoon; and Leong Siew Chor, who killed and dismembered his mainland Chinese mistress.

Among many other cases, Anandan also represented Muhammad Nasir Abdul Aziz who killed his lover's husband, Quek Loo Ming who caused the death of an elderly woman by poisoning, Pathip Selvan Sugumaran who killed his girlfriend, Wu Yun Yun who killed her brother-in-law, Eu Lim Hoklai who fatally stabbed a massage parlour owner, Salakau gang member Khairul Famy bin Mohamed Samsudin who fatally assaulted national football player Sulaiman bin Hashim, security guard Maniam Rathinswamy who murdered a loan shark, baby-killer Soosainathan Dass Saminathan, maid abuser Ng Hua Chye who abused and killed his maid, Mohamad Ashiek Salleh who murdered a taxi driver in Yishun, drug trafficker Pang Siew Fum who was assisted by Cheong Chun Yin to import 2 kg of heroin, fishmonger Lau Lee Peng who robbed and murdered his friend and fruit-seller Tan Eng Yan, schizophrenic Heng Boon Chai who killed his uncle, kidnapper Tan Ping Koon who abducted a child for ransom, army deserter Christopher Samson Anpalagan who robbed and murdered a lorry driver, lorry driver S Nagarajan Kuppusamy who killed a prison warden, Indonesian maid Purwanti Parji who killed her employer's mother-in-law, Malaysian drug trafficker Vignes Mourthi, lorry driver Ramu Annadavascan who murdered a boilerman, Vadivelu Kathikesan who killed two men in 1979, Jahabar Bagurudeen who killed a moneychanger, Ong Pang Siew who strangled his stepdaughter, convicted child abuser and con-man Chong Keng Chye, and the five gang members who were accused of murdering 19-year-old Republic Polytechnic student Darren Ng Wei Jie at Downtown East in 2010.

Anandan also represented convicted murderer Mathavakannan Kalimuthu in his 1997 appeal and 1998 clemency plea, and successfully convinced President of Singapore Ong Teng Cheong to grant then 19-year-old Mathavakannan clemency and commute his death sentence to life imprisonment. Anandan also defended mechanic Nadasan Chandra Secharan, who was charged with murdering his lover, and Anandan successfully convinced the Court of Appeal to overturn Nadasan's death sentence and issue him an acquittal on the grounds that he was not at the scene of crime and the prosecutors' weak evidence against him.

Other non-capital cases taken by Anandan also included a case involving actress Quan Yi Fong hitting a taxi driver in 2010, and a case involving retail tycoon Tang Wee Sung in 2008 — who tried to illegally purchase a kidney from a living donor, and Ong Mingwee who was accused of raping a woman he met at Zouk and was acquitted after hiring Anandan for his appeal.

== Former cases of Subhas Anandan ==
- Murder of Huang Na
- Anthony Ler
- Kallang River body parts murder
- Tan Chor Jin
- Oriental Hotel murder
- Murder of Sulaiman bin Hashim
- Death of Darren Ng Wei Jie
- Mathavakannan Kalimuthu
- Killing of Muawanatul Chasanah
- Pang Siew Fum
- 1998 Tampines flat murder
- Tan Ping Koon
- Mandai burnt car murder
- Vignes Mourthi
- Anjeli Elisaputri rape and murder
- Abduction of Sindee Neo
- Murder of Jaranjeet Singh
- Quek Loo Ming case
- Murder of Wan Cheon Kem
- Yishun taxi driver murders
- Murder of Tan Lead Sane
- Ang Mo Kio massage parlour murder
- Death of Ramapiram Kannickaisparry
- 2007 Marsiling flat murder
- Murder of Manap Sarlip
- 1999 Ang Mo Kio child abuse case
- Murder of Arumugam Jayamani
- Killing of Riana Agustina
- Purwanti Parji case
- Vadivelu Kathikesan murders
- Murder of Jeevitha Panippan
- Murder of Jagagevan Jayaram
- Heng Boon Chai

== See also ==
- Capital punishment in Singapore

== Bibliography ==
- Anandan, Subhas (2009). The Best I Could. Marshall Cavendish. ISBN 978-9812619587.
- Anandan, Subhas (2015). It's Easy To Cry. Marshall Cavendish. ISBN 9789814561525.
