= Killing of Sindee Neo =

2004 kidnapping and death of a four-year-old girl in Singapore

Sindee Neo
- Born: Sindee Neo; 2000; Singapore
- Died: 12 October 2004 (aged 4); Telok Blangah, Singapore
- Cause of death: Serious head injuries and fractured jaw from a fall
- Known for: Murder and kidnapping victim
- Parents: Neo Eng Tong (father); Kittiduangrat Ketkanok (mother)

On 7 October 2004, four-year-old Sindee Neo (Chinese: 梁欣蒂; pinyin: Liáng Xīndí) was abducted from her flat at Telok Blangah by 36-year-old Constance Chee Cheong Hin (Chinese: 徐嫦欣; pinyin: Xú Chángxīn), who formerly had an affair with Neo’s father. Neo subsequently fell from her apartment block and sustained severe head injuries, which resulted in her death five days later. Chee, who was allegedly responsible for Neo's fatal fall, was charged with murder, an offence which warranted the death penalty within Singapore's jurisdiction.

In January 2006, after a highly reported trial in 2005, Chee, who had been diagnosed with simple schizophrenia after her arrest, was found guilty of a reduced charge of culpable homicide and another charge of kidnapping, and despite the prosecution's request for the maximum sentence of life imprisonment for the first charge, Justice V. K. Rajah of the High Court sentenced Chee to a total of 13 years in prison on 7 April 2006.

== Background ==
Sindee Neo, born in 2000, was the first child and daughter of Neo Eng Tong and Kittiduangrat Ketkanok. Neo Eng Tong worked in a rag-and-bone business while Kittiduangrat, a Thai citizen, worked as a hawker assistant.

Sometime in 2003, Neo's father first befriended Constance Chee Cheong Hin, a former air stewardess of Singapore Airlines; Chee was jobless for three years before she was charged with killing Neo. This friendship developed into an illicit love affair, which ended in July 2004 due to deterioration in their relationship. By then, Neo's father owed Chee a total sum of about SGD$40,000, which Chee lent to Neo for him to start a business. Neo's father, who gambled the money away, did not pay the sum back to Chee, who continued to pester him to pay her back, either by phone call or coming to his flat to create a scene.

On 3 October 2004, things had finally gotten out of control, when Chee barged into the Neo family's flat at Telok Blangah to confront Neo's father, and 43-year-old Joseph Wong Tai Fatt, who rented a room inside Neo's flat, failed to stop Chee from entering the flat further. Chee had a heated argument with Neo's father before she escaped upon seeing that Neo's mother was about to come home.

== Neo's abduction and death ==
On the early morning of 7 October 2004, Constance Chee, then 36 years old, went to the Neo family's Telok Blangah flat. She managed to enter the unlocked flat at 4.30 am and kidnapped the sleeping Sindee Neo from her flat, possibly to get back at Neo's father. The girl's disappearance was immediately noticed by her parents and the flat's tenant, who all went to search for the four-year-old girl.

Less than 15 minutes after Neo was abducted, she was thrown off her block by Chee from an unknown height. Even though Neo's fall was broken by an awning, she nonetheless sustained both a fractured jaw and severe injuries to her head. Shortly after her fall, Neo's parents and tenant managed to stop Chee from escaping and she was subsequently arrested by police after the authorities were contacted. On 8 October 2004, a day after her arrest, Constance Chee was charged with attempted murder, an offense punishable by either life in prison or up to twenty years in jail.

After her fall, Neo was hospitalized at Singapore General Hospital for her injuries. Despite receiving medical treatment, Neo never regained consciousness, and on 12 October 2004, five days after the incident, four-year-old Sindee Neo died. As a result of Neo's death, Chee was brought back to court on 15 October 2004, where the prosecution amended the attempted murder charge to one of murder, which warranted the mandatory death penalty under Singapore law. Two weeks after the amendment of her charge sheet, Chee was remanded for psychiatric evaluation on 29 October 2004. A court order to extend Chee's psychiatric remand was issued on 19 November 2004.

The funeral and cremation of Neo was conducted on 16 October 2004, and reports stated that the funeral was attended by Neo's bereaved kin, who were heartbroken over the girl's death. In response to the news that Chee would be charged with murder, Neo's father stated that regardless of whatever charge Chee would face in court, nothing could bring his daughter back to life.

The murder of Sindee Neo, which brought shock to the whole nation, was one of the high-profile killings of children that happened in Singapore in the year 2004. Another one of these cases include the killing of Huang Na (occurred three days after Neo's case), a Chinese schoolgirl who was strangled by her mother’s Malaysian friend Took Leng How, who later received a death sentence for murdering Huang. It was also revealed that in Singapore during the year 2004 itself, there were a total of nine children whose deaths were mainly attributed to murder and familial violence.

== Trial of Constance Chee ==
=== Proceedings ===
The trial of Constance Chee Cheong Hin began at the High Court on 1 August 2005, less than a year after Sindee Neo was murdered. Chee was represented by veteran criminal lawyer Subhas Anandan and his two associates Anand Nalachandran and Sunil Sudheesan, while the prosecution was led by Wong Kok Weng. The trial was presided by Justice V. K. Rajah of the High Court.

Dr Stephen Phang, a government psychiatrist, found that Chee was suffering from schizophrenia, and it also substantially impaired her mental responsibility at the time she killed Sindee Neo. As a result, a month before her trial proceeded, the prosecution lowered Chee's murder charge to one of culpable homicide not amounting to murder (equivalent to manslaughter in Singapore's legal terms). The reduction of her murder charge meant that Chee would not be sentenced to death if found guilty, but she would possibly receive a sentence of either life imprisonment or up to ten years in prison. Not only that, the prosecution also brought up a second charge of wrongful abduction of a child from her legal guardianship, which carries the maximum penalty of ten years' imprisonment under Section 363 of the Penal Code.

During the trial, Dr Michael Tay Ming Kiong of the Health Sciences Authority testified for the prosecution that it was more possible to conclude that Chee had thrown the girl down, although it cannot be determined from which floor Neo was thrown and the exact height from where she fell. Dr Tay demonstrated in court his experiments of determining the manner of Neo's fall. In description, three bags of pork weighing 25 kg and packed with jointed sections to represent the head and limbs were used to simulate the child's weight and body. With the assistance of a female police officer whose weight and height was similar to Chee, Dr Tay tested the fall of the bags by both tipping over and throwing from the fourth, sixth and tenth storeys. In conclusion, Dr Tay determined that based on the impact of the fall, it was more likely that the girl was not tipped over but thrown off and it thus led to her fall to death. On the other hand, the defence's medical expert Dr Prakash Thamburaja, an associate professor from the Department of Mechanical Engineering at the National University of Singapore (NUS), contended that Neo died from a fall rather than it being the result of Chee's actions. Other than the dispute on whether Neo died from a fall or being thrown down, Dr Paul Chui, the forensic pathologist who performed an autopsy on Neo, testified that the head injuries and jaw fracture were sufficient to cause her death.

When she elected to give her defence on 23 August 2005, Chee mounted a defence that she did not throw the girl down but it was due to Neo falling off by accident. She claimed that she entered Neo's house to recover her loan from the girl's father but when she saw Neo's father sitting on his bed with a cleaver, which he prepared to use to attack her, Chee grabbed the sleeping Sindee in order to use the girl as a human shield. Chee claimed that she ran with Sindee up several flights of stairs, and when she got near to the corridor railing of one of the upper storeys, the crying Neo accidentally struggled in Chee's arms and fell over the railing. She also maintained she never wanted to harm the girl.

According to Anandan, during her time on the stand, Chee was not a good witness and was "nervous and temperamental" on the stand, and yet she was intelligent and able to maintain herself in the face of stern cross-examination by the trial prosecutor Wong Kok Weng, whom Anandan described as a "thorough gentleman" during his questioning of Chee at trial. The trial judge also noted that Chee was inconsistent in her evidence with regards to her conduct and decision to abduct Neo, as well as her disputed account on how did Neo fell to her death. Justice Rajah also wrote that it was unfortunate that per the psychiatric evidence, Chee herself refused to acknowledge that she was schizophrenic and required medical attention despite the psychiatric opinion.

=== Conviction and sentence ===
On 24 January 2006, Justice Rajah accepted the prosecution's medical evidence and found Constance Chee guilty of both charges, namely one count of culpable homicide and one count of kidnapping, stating that it was more clear that Chee had intentionally caused Neo to fall to her death. However, Justice Rajah postponed the sentencing trial to a later date in order to hear further psychiatric opinion to determine the appropriate sentence for Chee based on her condition and also to hear whether Chee had strong familial support to assist in her treatment for schizophrenia. Dr Stephen Phang, who represented the prosecution, submitted a new medical report, which contained his opinion that based on Chee's condition, she should be isolated from society as long as possible for the protection of the public and herself. Taking reference to Dr Phang's report, the prosecutors also argued that Chee should be sentenced to life in prison.

Chee's lawyer Subhas Anandan, who wrote about Chee's case in his autobiography, wrote that he was concerned that the psychiatric report by Dr Phang would influence Justice Rajah into ordering his client to serve a life sentence for killing Neo, because according to Anandan, Dr Phang was a "very officious" psychiatrist who was convinced that Chee should receive a life term or any longer sentence in view of her purported refusal to undergo treatment and her disregarding the doctors' contention that she was ill; Dr Phang also cited that Chee's condition was so severe that she may experience a "downward slide" of relapses in spite of treatment.

On 7 April 2006, three months after Chee's conviction, Justice Rajah sentenced 37-year-old Constance Chee Cheong Hin to 13 years' imprisonment. Justice Rajah explained that he did not agree to impose the maximum punishment of life imprisonment due to the prison psychiatrist's testimony that if Chee consistently receive medical treatment, her condition would improve and he also took into consideration of Chee's strong familial support.

Prior to Chee's sentencing, Anandan submitted to the court a sworn affidavit from Chee's three sisters, who all promised they would take care of her upon her release and constantly monitor her condition. One of Chee's sisters also made arrangements for Chee to live together with her permanently once Chee completed her sentence. Having taken into consideration these above factors, Justice Rajah decided to err on the side of leniency and chose to not conform to the prosecution's submission and Dr Phang's opinion. Instead, he meted out the alternative highest term of ten years' imprisonment for the culpable homicide charge and a consecutive three-year sentence with respect to the abduction charge. The aggregate sentence of 13 years was backdated to the date of Chee's remand on 8 October 2004. Anandan stated that from this instance, Justice Rajah received the respect of the legal community being a "courageous judge who knew the meaning of compassion" despite his short tenure on the Bench.

Reportedly, Neo's mother did not bear any grudge against anyone and only sought justice for her child. Neo's father was also remorseful of his infidelity and the death of his daughter, which resulted from him owing money to Chee and his relationship with her.

Chee initially appealed her conviction before she decided to withdraw her appeal. Chee subsequently served her sentence at Changi Women's Prison and she is currently released since 2017.

== Aftermath ==
The ruling in Constance Chee's case was a significant one due to the need for judges to be more flexible in their modes of sentencing towards mentally ill offenders based on their individual conditions. The case of Constance Chee also raised the concern where judges faced the dilemma of choosing between a life sentence or ten years' jail for mentally ill offenders convicted of culpable homicide, since it would hinder the judges from the consideration of imposing sentences that exceed ten years but less than life, since it would be deemed manifestly excessive to impose life imprisonment (just as ten years was considered manifestly inadequate) for those whom judges believe should remain in prison for more than ten years based on their psychiatric conditions and the duration of treatment behind bars. This was also partially influenced by the 1997 landmark appeal of Abdul Nasir Amer Hamsah, which led to the Court of Appeal ruling that the definition of life imprisonment should be a sentence that lasts the remainder of a convict's natural life rather than a fixed term of twenty years as previously defined. As a result of the Constance Chee case and several other cases, legal experts also proposed that the law should allow judges to mete out an alternative sentence of up to twenty years in prison other than life imprisonment in cases of culpable homicide, and this proposed change was made effective from 2008 onwards after the amendment of the Penal Code.

The Sindee Neo case was re-enacted by Crimewatch in 2006 as the third episode of the show's annual season.

In 2011, another Singaporean crime show In Cold Blood also re-enacted the case and aired it as the first episode of the show's first season.

This case was also recorded in Subhas Anandan's memoir The Best I Could, which features his early life, career and his notable cases. The memoir, first published in 2009, was adapted into a TV show of the same name, which runs for two seasons. Constance Chee's case was re-enacted and aired as the first episode of the show's second season (though some aspects of the case were altered for dramatic purposes). The case of Constance Chee was also one of Anandan's notable legal cases before Anandan died from a heart attack in 2015.

Assistant Superintendent of Police Khamisah Talip, aged 42 in 2014, recalled the case ten years after she first investigated the death of Sindee Neo. She stated that as a mother of two, she tried to not be emotional at the death of the girl, and she stated she still cannot forget the case despite it being one of the many cases she handled during her past 22 years as a police officer.

== See also ==
- Subhas Anandan
- Life imprisonment in Singapore
- List of kidnappings (2000–2009)
