= Sha Bakar Dawood =

First person executed under the 1973 Arms Offences Act of Singapore

- 1975 police mugshot of Sha Bakar bin Dawood
- Born: Sha Bakar bin Dawood; 1 January 1938; Singapore
- Died: 3 September 1976 (aged 38); Changi Prison, Singapore
- Cause of death: Execution by hanging
- Other name: Bakar Negro
- Occupation: Seaman (former)
- Status: Executed
- Conviction: Illegal discharge of a firearm with intent to cause hurt (five counts)
- Criminal charge: 1st, 2nd, 3rd, 4th and 5th charge: Illegal discharge of a firearm with intent to cause hurt at Thiam Siew Avenue; 12+ other charges of firearm robbery and discharge of firearms
- Penalty: Death (×5)

Sha Bakar bin Dawood, alias Bakar Negro, was a Singaporean seaman and armed robber who was wanted for committing an armed robbery and discharging a revolver at Thiam Siew Avenue in January 1975. In this particular case, Sha Bakar entered a brothel and threatened three people in an armed hold-up, and also wounded the three hostages by shooting his gun at them. Sha Bakar was afterwards confronted by the police, with whom he exchanged gunfire before he fled the scene. Sha Bakar subsequently ran off to Malaysia, where he was arrested by the Royal Malaysia Police at the border between Malaysia and Thailand within the same month of the shoot-out. The Thiam Siew Avenue robbery case was the sixth out of his three-month robbery spree from November 1974 to January 1975.

Sha Bakar was charged with multiple counts of firearm robbery and unlawful discharge of a firearm to cause hurt under the Arms Offences Act, a firearms law which mandated the death sentence for the use of firearms in Singapore. Sha Bakar was later found guilty of five counts of discharging a firearm to cause injury, and sentenced to death on 2 September 1975. After he failed to overturn his death sentence despite appealing the verdict, Sha Bakar was eventually hanged on 3 September 1976. Sha Bakar's case was the first recorded conviction under the newly enacted firearms law since it was first implemented in 1973.

== Biography and criminal career ==
Sha Bakar bin Dawood was born in Singapore in 1938. He grew up and worked as a seaman. He was unmarried and had no children.

During his teenage years in the 1950s, Sha Bakar had been brought to court for theft and robbery charges. In January 1955, Sha Bakar was charged with robbing a girl Wong Lan Quai of S$10 and another woman Waileen Wong on knifepoint for S$100. Four years later, in March 1959, Sha Bakar committed armed robbery at a canteen in Hollywood Theatre at Tanjong Katong Road, by using a knife to threaten Ong Teong Chai before taking away S$3 in cash and his watch worth S$25. Sha Bakar was jailed for these two offences.

In later years, Sha Bakar would go on to commit more crimes. In one of these cases, Sha Bakar robbed a lady at Geylang and took her handbag, which contained S$15, on 25 October 1974. In another case on 11 November 1974, Sha Bakar robbed a businessman at gunpoint at Yio Chu Kang and got off with S$7,000 in cash. Sha Bakar was noted to often wear dark glasses and a cap, and cover his face with a cloth, and he reportedly could speak broken English and a smattering of Hokkien. He was also infamously known by his nickname "Bakar Negro" as a criminal.

At the peak of his criminal career, Sha Bakar embarked on a three-month firearm robbery spree from November 1974 to January 1975, committing a total of six major robbery cases.

On 29 November 1974, Sha Bakar, then armed with a .22 Walther PPK pistol, robbed a woman Cynthia Ann Mok Ah Lee of S$1,704.91 at Joo Chiat post office, as well as shooting the victim and several bystanders (who all survived their injuries). On 14 December 1974, Sha Bakar robbed a group of five people of S$660 at gunpoint, and fired shots at the five victims and a bystander at Amber Road. Like the first case prior, these six people survived. The third case happened on 1974's Christmas Day (25 December 1974), when Sha Bakar took off with S$1,278 in cash and jewellery after robbing a snack bar at Katong and shooting its three occupants and a passer-by (who also survived). The fourth case of robbery occurred on 31 December 1974 at Ipoh Lane, where Sha Bakar robbed three people of S$575 in cash and valuables before shooting them (no fatalities), while in the fifth case, Sha Bakar robbed a woman Loh Yee Poh of her S$200 and jade penchant on 11 January 1975 at Rose Garden. It would be on the same day of the fifth case when Sha Bakar would commit his sixth and final robbery, which would be his most notorious crime to date, and it was also the same case that would send Sha Bakar to the gallows a year later.

== Thiam Siew Avenue shoot-out ==
On the night of 11 January 1975, merely 15 minutes after he robbed Loh Yee Poh of her penchant and cash, 37-year-old Sha Bakar bin Dawood, still armed with his gun, barged into a brothel at Thiam Siew Avenue, and held three people - 26-year-old brothel owner Wong Meng Seng, 78-year-old caretaker Tan Tai Meng and a young callgirl named Soyah binte Mohammed Ali - hostage.

According to the three victims' testimonies to the police and court, Sha Bakar brandished his revolver to fire one shot in the air, demanding the trio to give him money and valuables. When Tan refused, Sha Bakar fired at the elderly caretaker's abdomen and it caused Tan to collapse in pain, clutching his wound. As for both Soyah and Wong, the former forked out money from her handbag while Sha Bakar pointed the gun at her, but she was shot on the thigh after she refused to hand over her jewellery. Wong tried to rush forward to rescue Soyah, and it caused Sha Bakar to fire his pistol at Wong. Wong was presumed to be dead when he was shot and collapsed, but after Sha Bakar left the brothel with S$305, Wong, who actually got hit on his shoulder and was playing dead all along, got up and shouted for help. All three victims survived their injuries after seeking treatment at Singapore General Hospital.

Coincidentally, a group of police officers, led by Inspector Henry Thomas, witnessed Sha Bakar escaping the brothel, where they arrived at upon hearing the gunshots. Subsequently, the officers approached Sha Bakar and demanded him to surrender, but Sha Bakar fired a shot at Inspector Thomas, who dodged the shot and it led to a brief gunfight between Sha Bakar and the policemen. During the shoot-out, Sha Bakar was wounded twice by the police, including once on his arm, while two police detectives Krishnamurthy and Mohammed Saffihe Ahmad were shot at but not injured. Sha Bakar immediately fled the scene, leaving his revolver and two live rounds of ammunition behind, and subsequently, Sha Bakar managed to escape Singapore and left for Malaysia.

The police, through their investigations, managed to identify Sha Bakar and linked him to not only the brothel robbery and shoot-out, but also the other robberies he committed in the past three months. Sha Bakar was therefore placed on top of the police's wanted list, and having described Sha Bakar as the "most dangerous gunman" after Lim Ban Lim (an infamous cop-killer and gunman), the police appealed to the public to provide information of Sha Bakar's whereabouts and also sought help from the Malaysian authorities to help trace his whereabouts.

== Arrest ==
After his escape to Malaysia, Sha Bakar went to a local hospital in Johor Bahru to seek medical treatment for his gunshot injuries. Subsequently, he spent his days in hiding and travelled to the border between Malaysia and Thailand. However, the Royal Malaysia Police managed to get wind of Sha Bakar's whereabouts and on 27 January 1975, the Malaysian police ambushed Sha Bakar at the border, where they successfully arrested him for the offences he was wanted for in Singapore. Subsequently, Sha Bakar was brought to Alor Setar in the Malaysian state of Kedah, where the officers of the Singapore Police Force were dispatched to escort Sha Bakar back to Singapore.

After his arrest and extradition to Singapore in early February 1975, 37-year-old Sha Bakar bin Dawood was officially charged with multiple counts (at least eleven) of firearm robbery and illegal discharge of firearms under a new firearms law of Singapore, known as the Arms Offences Act. Under this new law, the death penalty was mandatory for the use or attempted use of a firearm to commit an offence or with intention to cause death or injury. Sha Bakar reportedly attempted to commit suicide while in remand, and had even fruitlessly tried to escape from police custody.

The Arms Offences Act, under which Sha Bakar was charged for the shooting, was earlier passed in November 1973 by Parliament in order to reduce gun violence in Singapore, in light of the several high-profile firearm-related cases and shoot-outs committed in Singapore, one of which was the case of notorious gunman Lim Ban Lim, who was wanted for the 1968 murder of police corporal Koh Chong Thye and later gunned down by police in 1972 during a gunfight at Margaret Drive.

== Death penalty trial ==
A Straits Times article published on 3 September 1975, when Sha Bakar's death sentence was featured on the headlines.

The trial of Sha Bakar bin Dawood took place at the High Court on 26 August 1975. He was represented by G Murugaiyan in the trial, while Allan Wong was the trial prosecutor of the case. The case was presided by two judges A V Winslow and D C D'Cotta. The prosecution proceeded with five out of the various charges against Sha Bakar during the trial. These five charges were related to the firearm robbery at Thiam Siew Avenue and the shooting of the victims and policemen in the same case. The victims and police officers involved in the shoot-out were summoned to court to testify against Sha Bakar during the trial. The defence counsel of Sha Bakar tried to raise doubts that the witnesses had wrongly identified Sha Bakar as the gunman who committed the robbery and sparked the gunfight on that night of 11 January 1975 itself.

In his defence, Sha Bakar put up a defence of alibi against the charges he was tried for. Sha Bakar claimed that he was on holiday in Johor Bahru when he accidentally got into a motorcycle accident, resulting in the injury on his arm. Sha Bakar added that he went to Thailand, but after crossing the border, and reaching Padang Besar where he planned to apply to extend his stay permit, he was approached by immigration officers, who asked him if he was a wanted man and also shown a newspaper with his photograph on the article. Overall, Sha Bakar denied that he was the person who fired shots at the three policemen and three bystanders near Thiam Siew Avenue.

On 2 September 1975, Justice A V Winslow and Justice D C D'Cotta delivered their verdict. In the verdict, which was read out by Justice Winslow, the trial judges found that there was sufficient evidence to prove that Sha Bakar was indeed at the scene of crime, firing his gun at bystanders in the brothel and getting into the gunfight with police. Therefore, they rejected Sha Bakar's alibi defence, and also made a finding that Sha Bakar did not injure his arm from the motorcycle accident, but from the shoot-out. Since Sha Bakar had intentionally fired his gun in order to cause harm to the police and civilians, the two judges therefore found him guilty of all five counts of discharging a firearm to cause hurt under the Arms Offences Act, making Sha Bakar the first person to be convicted under the Act since 1973. Consequently, 37-year-old Sha Bakar bin Dawood was sentenced to death for each of the offences which the trial court found him guilty of.

In the aftermath of Sha Bakar's trial, Inspector Henry Thomas, who had since promoted to Assistant Superintendent of Police (ASP), was commended by the Police Commissioner Tan Teck Khim for his bravery and courage when facing Sha Bakar at the shoot-out, as well as cracking the infamous case of the four-member "Swimming Trunk Gang", who were sentenced to a total of 64 years' imprisonment and 144 strokes of the cane for a series of 228 robberies and thefts. ASP Thomas described his experience as "frightening" when he was interviewed to speak about his ordeal.

== Execution ==
During the time when Sha Bakar was incarcerated on death row awaiting his execution, he appealed against his conviction and sentence, but it was rejected by the Court of Appeal on 19 January 1976, after the three judges - Chief Justice Wee Chong Jin, and Supreme Court judges F A Chua and Choor Singh – found that the witnesses had indeed correctly identified Sha Bakar as the gunman who terrorized them and shot at them and the policemen at the material time, and stated that the alibi defence of Sha Bakar was not credible to raise doubts over his guilt for the crime. Afterwards, Sha Bakar's motion for special leave to appeal to the Privy Council in London was also dismissed on 21 May 1976, after the Privy Council's judges affirmed the appellate court's findings in his case. His clemency petition was also turned down by then President of Singapore Benjamin Sheares.

On the morning of 3 September 1976, after eating his last meal the night before, 38-year-old Sha Bakar bin Dawood was hanged at Changi Prison. His body was later retrieved by his family for burial the same day. With his execution, Sha Bakar became the first person to be put to death under the Arms Offences Act since its enactment in 1973.

In the aftermath of Sha Bakar's execution, due to the enactment of the Arms Offences Act, the total number of firearm robbery cases fell from a peak of 174 in 1973, when the death penalty was first introduced, to 106 in the following year 1974. Since then, such cases have become rare in Singapore, with no cases reported from 2007 to 2020. The law itself became part of Singapore's tough stance that the death penalty was the reason that allowed Singapore to become one of the safest countries in the world with low crime rates, as well as annihilating the rampant rate of gun violence in Singapore. Subsequently, in the next few decades after Sha Bakar was executed, there would be a few more high-profile cases of people found guilty of discharging a firearm to cause injury or death, and also sentenced to death under the Act like Sha Bakar. These criminals include cop-killer Ong Yeow Tian, Malaysian robber Ng Theng Shuang, serial robber Lim Chwee Soon, wanted gunman Khor Kok Soon, and the "One-Eyed Dragon" Tan Chor Jin.

== See also ==
- Tan Chor Jin
- Khor Kok Soon
- Ong Yeow Tian
- Lim Chwee Soon
- Ng Theng Shuang
- Arms Offences Act
- Capital punishment in Singapore
