= Talib Haji Hamzah =

First person sentenced to death as an accomplice of firearms offence in Singapore

- Talib Haji Hamzah, the soto seller executed under the Arms Offences Act
- Born: Talib bin Haji Hamzah c. 1953; Batu Pahat, Johor, Malaysia
- Died: 28 January 1977 (aged 23); Changi Prison, Singapore
- Cause of death: Execution by hanging
- Occupation: Soto seller
- Status: Executed
- Motive: Robbery
- Conviction: Being an accomplice of firearm robbery under Section 5 of the Arms Offences Act (x2)
- Criminal charges: Being an accomplice of firearm robbery under Section 5 of the Arms Offences Act (x2); Firearm robbery (x2)
- Penalty: Death by hanging (x2)

Talib bin Haji Hamzah (c. 1953 – 28 January 1977) was a Malaysian-born soto seller and member of a notorious armed robbery gang who was responsible for at least two firearm robberies between September and December 1974. Talib, who fled to Malaysia along with his five other gang members, was arrested during the same month he committed the second robbery, and he was extradited back to Singapore for trial. Talib was charged under the Arms Offences Act for being an accomplice in a firearm offence, which warranted the death penalty if found guilty. Although Talib claimed that he was threatened by his leader (who committed suicide in 1974) into joining and committing the robberies, Talib's defence was rejected and he was therefore found guilty and sentenced to death on 1 October 1975. Talib, who was executed by hanging on 28 January 1977, was the first person to be handed the death penalty for being an accomplice of a firearm offence under the Arms Offences Act in Singapore's legal history.

== Background and criminal conduct ==
Talib bin Haji Hamzah was born in Malaya (present-day Malaysia) sometime in 1953, and his hometown was located in Batu Pahat within the Malaysian state of Johor. During his adulthood, Talib worked as a soto seller.

At one point after reaching adulthood, Talib became a member of the "Botak" gang, a notorious gang of six armed robbers who were behind a spate of firearm robberies that happened in Singapore between March and December 1974. The gang was led by an infamous fugitive and Malaysian gunman named Jamaluddin bin Abu Bakar. Jamaluddin, who was previously jailed for seven years at Changi Prison, was wanted by the Singaporean authorities for the murder of a shopkeeper at a Geylang goldsmith shop on 23 January 1974. Jamaluddin, who was one of the two killers behind the case, fled to Malaysia and therefore established his gang of robbers, in which Talib became a member. The first crime committed by the gang was at Tanglin Road in March 1974, when the robbers reaped a loot worth S$150,000 from the Tanglin jewellery shop they targeted.

On 17 September 1974, Talib and his four gang members robbed a jewellery shop Nam Yick Jewellers at North Bridge Road and held the owner Poon Cheok Meng at gunpoint, and made off with over valuables worth S$30,000 on a hijacked taxi. On 9 December 1974, Talib and his gang once again committed firearm robbery at Arab Street, where they robbed another jewellery shop Mandarin Jewellers and made off with a loot of jewellery worth S$118,539 in total. Each time after the robbery attempt, Talib and his accomplices escaped to Malaysia and went into hiding at Johor Bahru in spite of the extensive manhunts conducted by the Singaporean police, before they sneaked back into Singapore to commit another crime. During the second robbery attempt, one of Talib's accomplices had also fired seven shots at a Cisco guard, and all missed the guard.

== Arrest and charges ==
After committing the second firearm robbery, Talib bin Haji Hamzah and the rest of the Botak gang evaded the Singaporean authorities and once again successfully fled to Malaysia. However, merely two days later, the law caught up with them.

On 11 December 1974, the Royal Malaysia Police managed to trace the Botak gang to their hiding place in the Lumba Kuda flats at Johor Bahru. The Malaysian police, coupled with officers of the Singapore Police Force, arrived at the flats, where Talib, the Botak gang headman Jamaluddin and their other four fellow gang members (whose identities remain unknown) were hiding, and they ordered the gang to surrender. However, a gunfight ensued between the officers and Jamaluddin, who refused to surrender even after tear gas had been fired into the flats. Eventually, Jamaluddin was trapped inside the area but before the police could arrest him, 27-year-old Jamaluddin bin Abu Bakar turned his Browning automatic pistol on himself and died from a sole gunshot wound to the left temple. Jamaluddin was found with his pistol in one hand and a grenade on the other hand when the police recovered his corpse.

Soon after the death of Jamaluddin, Talib and two Botak gang members surrendered themselves to the police while the final two members managed to evade the authorities and escaped. The last two members were eventually arrested within the following week, and over S$100,000 worth of jewellery were recovered by the police.

Following arrangements between the Malaysian and Singaporean authorities, in January 1975, Talib was extradited back to Singapore to be investigated for his involvement in the gang robberies committed by the Botak gang. Talib was charged with two counts of being an accomplice of firearm robbery, an offence which mandated the death sentence under the Arms Offences Act if found guilty. Talib was, to date, the sole member of the Botak gang to be extradited and face trial in Singapore for the crimes they committed in the city-state; the fates of Talib's surviving accomplices remain unknown till this day. At the time of Talib's indictment, the Arms Offences Act was enacted for only two years and it was implemented to impose harsh punishments (including death) to curb the escalating rate of gun violence rate in Singapore back in the 1970s.

== Death penalty trial ==
On 20 August 1975, 22-year-old Talib bin Haji Hamzah claimed trial at the High Court for two counts of being an accomplice of firearm robbery under the Arms Offences Act. Talib, who pleaded not guilty to both charges, was represented by state-assigned lawyer Abdul Rashid while the prosecution was led by Loh Lin Kok, and the trial was presided by two trial judges - Justice Dennis Cosmos D'Cotta (D C D'Cotta) and Justice Thilliampalam Kulasekaram (T Kulasekaram). Another two charges of firearm robbery tendered against Talib for his other offences were temporarily stood down during the trial proceedings.

During the trial itself, the prosecution called upon witnesses, mainly those who were victims of the two robberies, to testify about the crimes that happened at the respective shops. In the first case, Poon Wai Kong, the son of Poon Cheok Meng, who was the owner of Nam Yick Jewellers (the same shop where the first robbery happened), appeared as a witness, and he testified that on the afternoon of 17 September 1974, when he was behind the showcase, he heard gunshots and he saw five men barging in the shop to commit robbery, and one of them acted as look-out while the rest went to grab the jewellery. Poon said that when his 61-year-old father appeared, one of the robbers aimed the gun at his father's head and fired twice, but fortunately for the old man, no bullets came out, and so, the robbers fled after Poon's father raised an alarm, and they left in a taxi.

As for the second case, 37-year-old Leow Han Chuah, the managing director of Mandarin Jewellers (the same shop where the second robbery took place), also appeared as a witness and he testified that at the time, he was present in the shop with six other employees when at least four robbers (including Talib) had entered the shop, threatened them at gunpoint and took the jewelry. Leow also testified that he heard gunshots coming from outside his shop. Other facts revealed that these gunshots were made during the robbers' escape attempt; the first was when one of them fired the gun at a taxi driver, ordering him to drive them to another area while hijacking the taxi, and the other two were fired when Cisco guard Idros bin Abu Bakar, who heard the first gunshot, arrived to witness the gang hijacking the taxi and it led to one of the robbers discharging the gun at Idros, who was not hurt from the shoot-out. Two police inspectors, Quek Kah Pok and Joseph Lau Cher Thiam, also testified that they found spent cartridges from a gun when inspecting both the crime scenes in September and December 1974 respectively.

However, during the course of the trial, Talib alleged that his statement was not fully made out of voluntariness, as he was allegedly told by the Inspector Joseph Lau that he better make a statement before the magistrate in exchange for a lighter sentence. It was further revealed in court that Inspector Lau had only two years of experience as a police inspector, but the prosecution did not agree with Talib's contention even though they said the inspector actually informed Talib that he would record a statement. Subsequently, after a trial within a trial, the statement given by Talib was ruled inadmissible as evidence in court, but it did not affect the strength of the prosecution's case, and the trial court ruled that there was a case for Talib to answer, urging Talib to put up his defence.

At the close of the prosecution's case, Talib elected to not give his defence under oath, and instead, he chose to give an unsworn statement from the dock. In his unsworn testimony, Talib recounted that he did not voluntarily took part in the two robberies. Talib claimed that it was Jamaluddin who lured him into committing the first robbery, and it was agreed during a meeting that the guns could only be used to fire warning shots instead of causing injury to anyone, and Jamaluddin also threatened Talib to join in the second robbery, claiming that he would be killed if he did not help them commit the crime. Talib also testified that he was never armed in both instances of robbery. The defence also argued that Talib was not a hardcore criminal and he was incapable of making any reasonable steps to prevent the use of firearms based on his state of mind at the material time, but the prosecution refuted Talib's account as improbable and highly unsatisfactory, stating that it was clear that there was premeditation to use the guns to commit robbery and furthermore, to cause hurt if necessary, and there was a plan and intent to rob the jewelers in these two cases, and it was not possible for Talib to be enticed to join the first robbery bid on promises of wealth on one hand while joining the second robbery attempt for fear of his life on the other hand.

On 1 October 1975, after a trial lasting eight days, Justice T Kulasekaram and Justice D C D'Cotta delivered their verdict, with Justice Kulasekaram pronouncing their joint decision in court. Justice Kulasekaram stated that after careful consideration of the facts, he and Justice D'Cotta unanimously determined that Talib had not raised a reasonable doubt over the prosecution's case, and they found there was sufficient evidence to prove that Talib was a willing accomplice to the firearm robberies, in which guns were used to commit robbery and fired with intent to cause harm, and thus rejected Talib's account. Therefore, 22-year-old Talib bin Haji Hamzah was found guilty of two counts of being an accomplice of a firearm robbery under Section 5 of the Arms Offences Act, and sentenced to death by hanging. Talib was the first person to be handed the death penalty for being an accomplice of a firearm offence under the Arms Offences Act.

Talib's sentencing came merely a month after the sentencing trial of Sha Bakar Dawood, an infamous gunman who became the overall first criminal to be convicted under the Arms Offences Act. Sha Bakar, who went by the alias Bakar Negro, was sentenced to death for shooting at three people during an armed hold-up at a brothel near Thiam Siew Avenue in 1975. Sha Bakar, who later lost his appeals, was eventually hanged at dawn on 3 September 1976, therefore becoming the first person to be hanged under the Arms Offences Act since 1973.

== Appeals ==
By February 1976, Talib bin Haji Hamzah filed a notice of appeal against his conviction and sentence. In April 1976, the appeal was heard before the Court of Appeal, with veteran lawyer and opposition politician David Saul Marshall arguing that Talib should not be held liable to the charges preferred against him under the Arms Offences Act due to the minor role he played and he was not responsible for the injuries caused or attempted during the shoot-out, and that the trial court did not make correct findings on whether Talib had reasonable knowledge that firearms would be used during the commission of robbery in both cases he was tried for. This was rebutted by the prosecutor Loh Lin Kok, who said that Talib's association with the gunmen should also lead to the inference that he reasonably expected the potential use of firearms during the robbery bids pulled off by his gang.

On 18 May 1976, after reserving judgement for about a month, the appellate court's three judges - Chief Justice Wee Chong Jin and two Supreme Court judges Frederick Arthur Chua (F A Chua) and Choor Singh - dismissed Talib's appeal and upheld his two death sentences and double conviction under the Arms Offences Act, after they rejected the defence's submissions and found that there was premeditation and planning through the decision to bring firearms to commit robbery and it was reasonable to infer that Talib had the knowledge that the guns would be used during the robberies, and he thus should be held responsible for the role he played in these cases.

In October 1976, Talib filed a motion to seek special leave to appeal to the Privy Council in London for a review of his conviction and sentence. However, the Privy Council rejected Talib's appeal and therefore confirmed the death penalty in Talib's case.

== Execution ==
At the age of 23, Talib bin Haji Hamzah was hanged in Changi Prison on the Friday morning of 28 January 1977. On the same date of Talib's execution, a convicted murderer named Nadarajah Govindasamy was put to death for the cold-blooded murder of his daughter's fiancé Mohamed Azad Mohamed Hussein back in November 1974. Nadarajah, a Hindu devotee who disapproved of his daughter's engagement with Mohamed Azad (due to the victim being a Muslim), was sentenced to hang in August 1975 for the crime and like Talib, he also lost his appeals to the Court of Appeal and Privy Council prior to his execution.

At the time of his execution, Talib was the second person to be executed under the Arms Offences Act since 1973, and this status was confirmed in 1979 when three gunmen - Lee Keng Guan, Wong Loke Fatt and Ho Joo Huat - were hanged on 11 May of that same year for a firearm robbery back in 1974.

== See also ==
- Sha Bakar Dawood
- Arms Offences Act
- Capital punishment in Singapore
- List of major crimes in Singapore
