= Murder of Tan Tiong Huat =

1997 murder of a moneylender by shooting in Singapore

Tan Tiong Huat
- Tan Tiong Huat, who was gunned down in 1997
- Born: 1954; Colony of Singapore
- Died: 12 March 1997 (aged 43); Beach Road, Singapore
- Cause of death: Fatal gunshot wound to the head
- Other names: Ah Seng; Da Fei Cheng
- Occupations: Grocery store owner Moneylender (illegal)
- Employer: Himself
- Known for: Murder victim
- Spouse: "Madam Lin"
- Children: 4

On 12 March 1997, a loan shark named Tan Tiong Huat (Chinese: 陈中发; pinyin: Chén Zhōngfā; Pe̍h-ōe-jī: Tân Tiong-hoat) was shot to death at a carpark in Singapore's Beach Road. The suspected gunman fled Singapore for Thailand, where he was eventually caught and extradited back to Singapore for trial seven years later. The gunman, Lim Thian Lai (Chinese: 林添来; pinyin: Lín Tiānlái; Pe̍h-ōe-jī: Lîm Thiam-lâi), was charged with murdering Tan before he was put on trial for an amended charge of illegally discharging a firearm to cause death. Although Lim put up a defense that he was innocent and it was another person who killed Tan, the trial court found him guilty of shooting Tan to death under the Arms Offences Act and sentenced him to the mandatory death penalty for the crime.

== Fatal shooting ==
On the night of 12 March 1997, a man was discovered lying motionless in a pool of blood at a carpark below a HDB block in Beach Road, Singapore. The man was pronounced dead upon the arrival of paramedics.

The victim was identified as 43-year-old Tan Tiong Huat, alias Ah Seng (Chinese: 阿成; Pe̍h-ōe-jī: A-Sêng) or Da Fei Cheng (Chinese: 大肥成; pinyin: Dà Féichéng), who was a businessman operating a grocery store. Tan had a gunshot wound on his head when his body was found, and his gold accessories, cash and watch were left untouched. An autopsy was later carried out by forensic pathologist Gilbert Lau, and he revealed that the cause of Tan's death was a "disruptive intracranial injury with consequential severe haemorrhaging", and the wound was caused by a low calibre gunshot delivered "from a slightly elevated position", and the bullet had penetrated Tan's skull.

Tan was survived by his 36-year-old wife "Madam Lin" (whom he married more than ten years before), his three sons and one daughter. According to his family, Tan was a bad-tempered person with a domineering personality, and was extremely secretive about his work and activities outside home. Tan was also said to have a patriarchal mindset and he refused his wife's offer to help out at his grocery store and wanted her to continue as a housewife and take care of their children. Even so, Tan was acknowledged as a dedicated family man and his four children reportedly wept upon hearing of their father's death. Tan had a large social circle due to his business dealings.

Police records also showed that between 1987 and 1996, Tan was previously charged thrice for moneylending activities, and had also been charged for voluntarily causing hurt. Tan was also a notorious moneylender who operated at Golden Mile Complex, his clients predominantly Thai nationals or those who had business dealings with Thais.

== Investigation and coroner's inquiry ==
The police classified Tan's death as murder. They concluded that the motive for the killing was not robbery since the valuables in Tan's possession were not stolen, and they determined that the murder was likely committed by someone out of hatred or revenge for a possible dispute. Residents of the area told the police that the carpark was quiet and was under construction, and not often filled with people.

During the month after Tan was murdered, the police received a tip-off from an informant that he knew a man who admitted to shooting Tan to death over a dispute. However, as the alleged suspect had left Singapore for Thailand, the police were unable to trace his whereabouts, and the case remained open for investigations.

In August 2001, four years after the murder, a coroner's inquiry was conducted. The coroner's court returned a verdict of "murder by person or persons unknown" in the case, which remained classified as an unsolved case in police files.

== Arrest of killer ==
On 3 October 2004, seven years after the murder of Tan Tiong Huat, it was reported that a suspect was arrested in Thailand and extradited to Singapore for investigations. The suspect was discovered in Thailand, where he was arrested and incarcerated for committing an unknown offence. The suspect was released after completing his sentence on 30 September 2004 and repatriated back to Singapore.

After his arrival, the suspect, identified as 48-year-old Lim Thian Lai, was charged with murder for having shot Tan to death in March 1997. If found guilty, Lim would be handed the death penalty under Section 302 of the Singaporean Penal Code.

== Trial of Lim Thian Lai ==
=== Prosecution's case ===
On 25 April 2005, six months after his extradition to Singapore, Lim Thian Lai stood trial at the High Court for the fatal shooting of Tan Tiong Huat in 1997. The charge of murder against Lim was amended to one of illegally discharging a firearm with intent to cause death or injury under Section 4(1) of the Arms Offences Act. Under the Act, the death sentence was mandated for the offence, meaning that Lim would still face the gallows if convicted. The trial was presided over by Justice V K Rajah, and the prosecution was led by Imran Abdul Hamid and Adam Nakhoda, while Lim was represented by Lim Tse Haw and Andy Yeo.

During the trial, the court was told that about two or three days before the shooting incident in March 1997, a friend of Lim, only known as "PW21" in court documents, met Lim at the Immigration and Checkpoints Authority and during this meeting, Lim told PW21 that he wanted to kill Tan and his plan was to carry it out within the next seven to ten days. According to PW21, Lim was angry at Tan for treating him like a "nobody", and having borrowed several thousand dollars from Tan to open a garment shop for himself in the past, Lim received persistent harassment from Tan, who wanted Lim to return him the money. Lim reportedly showed the witness an object tucked at the right side of his waist, and the witness said the object resembled the butt of a gun, and Lim allegedly told PW21 that he originally wanted to kill PW21 too. PW21 said that a week after the incident, he heard from Lim that he had killed the victim. Similarly, on the afternoon of 12 March 1997, hours before the killing, Lim told another friend named Tham Boon Hwa at coffee shop nearby the murder scene that he wanted to murder Tan over the unhappiness he had with the moneylender, although Tham tried to stop him to no avail.

Lim said that he bought a 0.38 calibre revolver for 15000 Thai baht in Thailand and smuggled it into Singapore, and due to his prior issues with Tan, as well as the fact that Tan spewed vulgarities at Lim's wife over the debt, Lim wanted to shoot Tan. On the night of the shooting, Lim met up with Tan at a carpark in Beach Road under the pretext of wanting to pay him back. Upon Tan's arrival, the two men again argued and Tan allegedly insulted Lim's parents, and although Lim gave him S$2300 to diffuse the argument, Tan was dissatisfied and persisted in scolding Lim's parents. Lim, who hid the gun near a tree located opposite the Kallang River, lied to Tan that he would get more cash, and then went to the tree to retrieve the gun and from behind, aimed the revolver at the back of Tan's head and opened fire once. Immediately after the gunshot, Tan fell forward and landed on the cement pavement of the carpark.

After shooting Tan, Lim cycled to Waterloo Street and later boarded a taxi to cross the Woodlands Checkpoint and fled to Johor Bahru, Malaysia. Lim spent about a day hiding at Johor, where he disposed of the gun at an unknown location, before he returned to Singapore for his wife, who lived with him at Geylang, and he disposed of his ammunition by flushing them in the toilet's drainage pipe. After some time, Lim heard rumours that the police were searching for him as a suspect, and fled the country on 31 March 1997 by taking a bus to Thailand. The revolver and bullets were never recovered.

=== Lim's allegations of police abuse and defence ===
In midst of the trial, Lim denied that he voluntarily confessed to police about the murder. Lim revealed that at age 15, he was wrongfully arrested for stealing a motorcycle and was assaulted by police investigators during interrogation, and this incident, together with several other violations of the law, made him harbor apprehensions towards the police. Lim alleged that the police investigators - Senior Station Inspector Zainal Abidin Ismail, Station Inspector Roy Lim, Station Inspector Han Khoe Juan, Station Inspector Erulandy Guruthevan and Senior Station Inspector Shen Yen Ek - had threatened him to confess. Lim said that on the plane, both Lim and Han threatened him verbally to admit to the murder, and after they arrived in Singapore, Lim was reportedly induced by Zainal to admit to the crime, and that his charge of murder would be reduced to manslaughter and he might spend only a few years in prison, and Zainal also told Lim to "eat this piece of shit" if he did not confess.

Lim said that during his interactions with Inspector Lim, he was repeatedly reminded that they were on the 18th floor, and he perceived it to be a threat that he would be thrown down the 18th floor if he did not confess. Lim told a government psychiatrist, Stephen Phang, that he was threatened by "four or five mouths" to confess. However, all the investigators stated that there was no threat or inducement made, and Lim voluntarily admitted to the crime and even expressed remorse, and the first time he ever proclaimed his innocence was during his interaction with Phang.

After the end of the prosecution's case, the trial judge ruled that there was a case for Lim to answer and ordered him to enter a defence. Lim elected to testify, and while he was unwilling to respond during cross-examination, he continued to insist that he was innocent and his confession was not true. Lim said that the real killer was someone else, and that he lost his gun prior to the shooting incident. Lim said he kept the gun inside a storage box on the back of his bicycle, which he parked somewhere at Golden Mile Complex for two to three days before the shooting, and he only found out on the day of the murder that his gun and ammunition were missing, and he therefore brought along a fake gun with a view to intimidate Tan.

Additionally, Lim said that on that night of Tan's murder, Lim and Tan met up and they were arguing with regards to Tan's continued harassment of Lim over the debt, and it was during that dispute, when Lim saw a “big sized” man who was wearing a dark shirt and Thai straw hat coming from behind Tan, aimed a gun and discharging one live round from the back of Tan's head, killing him on the spot. The mysterious gunman fled the scene, and Lim also ran away out of fear of being implicated in Tan's death, and went home to dispose of his ammunition, and Lim, who only told the psychiatrist about the mysterious gunman, said he never told the police about this gunman at the first instance due to his fear that the police would not believe him, and Lim concluded his defence on 14 May 2005. His testimony was however, refuted by the prosecution, who stated that there was no mystery gunman and it was clear from the onset that Lim was responsible for the murder and drew attention to his numerous attempts to distance him from the crime and inconsistencies in his evidence.

=== Verdict ===
On 27 May 2005, Justice V K Rajah delivered his verdict. Rajah rejected Lim's allegations that he was innocent and his confession was given out of coercion, and ruled in favour of the prosecution that Lim confessed voluntarily and the police investigators did not induce or threaten him to confess. He noted that the defence did not put forward these allegations during their cross-examination of the policemen in court. Rajah found that Lim was not a credible witness as he kept giving multiple inconsistent accounts of the crime and found it too incredible that the murder was committed by a mysterious gunman, which he noted the gunman first mentioned only during the trial and to Phang during his psychiatric remand.

Rajah also said that based on the totality of the evidence, it was clear that Lim, who felt aggrieved at the harassment of Tan and his own predicament, as well as how Tan insulted Lim's wife, decided to bring the revolver with him and meet up with Tan, and had the intent to shoot Tan to death over the conflicts they had, and this was especially so after Tan remorselessly scolded Lim's parents and got rough with Lim. Based on his observations, and finding that Lim had intentionally discharging a firearm with an intent to cause harm or death, Rajah was satisfied that the prosecution had proven its case against Lim beyond a reasonable doubt.

Rajah found 49-year-old Lim Thian Lai guilty of one count of unlawfully discharging a firearm under Section 4(1) of the Arms Offences Act. Upon his conviction, Lim was sentenced to death by hanging.

== Lim's fate ==
On 26 September 2005, four months after Lim was sentenced to hang, his appeal against the death sentence was dismissed by the Court of Appeal. The three judges - Chief Justice Yong Pung How, and two Judges of Appeal L P Thean (Thean Lip Ping) and Chao Hick Tin - rejected Lim's defence that a mysterious gunman was responsible for the murder and accepted that the witnesses were truthful in their testimonies against Lim, whose defence contained numerous inconsistencies and was contradicted by objective evidence presented during the trial.

After the loss of his appeal, Lim was hanged at Changi Prison on an unknown date in 2006, one of two convicts executed for firearm offences that year. The other prisoner was Khor Kok Soon, a gunman and fugitive convicted of shooting at a police officer in 1984.

Three years after the hangings of Khor and Lim, gang lord Tan Chor Jin (alias Tony Kia or One-Eyed Dragon) was hanged on 9 January 2009 for firing a gun and killing a nightclub owner Lim Hock Soon. Tan was, to date, the last person to be put to death under the Arms Offences Act.

== See also ==
- Arms Offences Act
- Capital punishment in Singapore
- List of major crimes in Singapore
