= Lim Keng Peng =

Singaporean fugitive and murderer

- Born: Lim Keng Peng c. 1953; Singapore
- Died: 3 May 1988 (aged 35); Sunset Way, Singapore
- Other names: Ah Huat; Ah Leng; Oh Leong; Ah Leong; Peter Lim
- Occupations: Shipyard worker (former); Construction business owner (former)
- Known for: One of Singapore's most wanted fugitives in the 1980s
- Spouse: Unnamed wife (separated)
- Status: Died before trial
- Conviction: None
- Criminal charge: Murder (×2)
- Penalty: None

Lim Keng Peng (Chinese: 林景明; pinyin: Lín Jĭngmíng; Pe̍h-ōe-jī: Lîm Kéng-bêng; (Note: Lim's Chinese name was also spelt as 林景平 Lín Jĭngpíng or 林庆平 Lín Qìngpíng) c. 1953 – 3 May 1988), better known as Ah Huat (Chinese: 阿发; pinyin: A Fā; Pe̍h-ōe-jī: A Hoat), was a Singaporean criminal who was wanted for the murder of a police detective named Goh Ah Khia in December 1985. While Lim did not have any prior criminal record before he killed Detective Goh, Lim was also involved in the fatal shooting of a restaurant owner, Vincent Loke Kok Nam, which occurred in April of the same year he killed the policeman. Lim, who went into hiding, subsequently became one of Singapore's ten most wanted criminals. After a 30-month manhunt, Lim was discovered and killed during a police ambush. A coroner's court found Lim guilty of the two murders he was accused for, and his death was ruled as a lawful killing.

== Biography ==
Born as the eldest son in a family of seven children in Singapore, Lim Keng Peng had four younger brothers and two younger sisters. (Note: A source however, claimed that Lim have five siblings, consisting of three brothers and two sisters.)

Lim, who went to a Catholic school as a child, later studied up to Secondary Four in Queenstown Secondary Technical School. After completing his schooling, Lim went to work at a shipyard, and he also became the owner of a construction business. After this, Lim left the job and went to look for employment opportunities in Malaysia. He also worked as a temple medium at one point.

Lim was a devout Buddhist, and he was able to speak Thai due to his frequent travels to Thailand. Lim was known to be well mannered and had a good relationship with his parents and siblings. However, he also had a heavy drinking habit and would often get violent when drunk. That habit would lead to him becoming one of Singapore's most wanted criminals.

== Murder charges ==
=== Murder of Vincent Loke Kok Nam ===
On 2 April 1985, at his restaurant in River Valley Road, 43-year-old Vincent Loke Kok Nam (Chinese: 陆国楠; pinyin: Lù Guònán; Pe̍h-ūe-jī: Lo̍k Kok-nâm) was shot dead by a customer, who was identified three years later as Lim Keng Peng.

Lim was said to have gone into Loke's restaurant to buy a packet of food, and he left after getting his food. However, moments later, Lim returned to the shop, and complained to Loke that his packet was leaking. As Loke stood at the counter with Lim facing him, Lim allegedly whispered something to Loke before he pulled out a gun to fire a single shot at Loke, killing him, before Lim ran off, leaving his motorcycle behind. The motive for the killing was unknown, and the police were unable to identify a possible suspect in the case, despite getting the description that the gunman was left-handed. Loke was survived by his wife Carol Loke and two sons, aged 10 and 15. The restaurant was closed for weeks by Loke's wife (who became the new owner) in light of Loke's death, before it re-opened.

Singaporean crime show Crimewatch re-enacted the shooting of Vincent Loke and aired it on television in March 1986, and the police sent a public appeal through the episode for information to solve the case. Still, the murder of Loke remained unsolved up until the death of Lim in 1988, when his involvement was finally discovered by the police.

=== Murder of Goh Ah Khia ===
On 18 December 1985, eight months after he committed his first murder, 32-year-old Lim Keng Peng once again killed a person; his second victim was a police detective.

Prior to the brutal killing, a police report was lodged by one of Lim's tenants that after a drunken altercation between Lim and her husband, Lim had stolen her handbag in their rented flat, and he was last sighted entering a red Toyota and leaving the flat. A team of two policemen trailed Lim all the way to Jalan Pelikat in Upper Serangoon.

Later, the officers approached Lim at Jalan Pelikat, and they told him to stop driving. However, Lim whipped out his revolver and fired a shot at one of the officers before he fled. The injured officer, 41-year-old detective Goh Ah Khia (Note: His name was also spelt as Goh Ah Kia) (Chinese: 吴亚仔; pinyin: Wú Yàzǎi; Pe̍h-ōe-jī: Gô͘ A-kiáⁿ), died the next day due to the gunshot wound in his chest. At the time he died, Detective Goh left behind a wife, and two children - a son and a daughter - aged 13 and nine respectively. His wife reportedly told the press that she was proud of her husband, who died an honourable death while discharging his duties as a policeman.

The brutality of Detective Goh's killing recalled five past cases where policemen were murdered while in the line of duty during the past two decades prior to the case.

== Wanted list ==
As a result of the detective's murder, 32-year-old Lim Keng Peng was immediately placed among the top ten suspects on the police's wanted list.

The police sent out public appeals for information leading up to the arrest of Lim on the charge of murdering Detective Goh Ah Khia. They also sent a warning to members of the public to beware of Lim and also to not harbour Lim, as the crime of harbouring a criminal carries the maximum sentence of five years' imprisonment, in addition to a fine. Searches were also conducted in flats to capture Lim. Lim Keng Peng was considered to be the most dangerous criminal the police encountered ever since the case of Lim Ban Lim, a notorious gunman wanted for killing a policeman before he was killed by the police during a gunfight in November 1972. By July 1987, Lim Keng Peng rose to become the No. 1 wanted criminal on the police's list of fugitives at large.

Crimewatch, a Singaporean crime show, re-enacted the case of Detective Goh's murder and aired it on television in June 1987, and the police also sent out another appeal to the Singaporean public to raise awareness of Lim's case and encourage members of the public to come forward should they have any information about Lim's whereabouts. The Singapore Police Force also sought help from Malaysia and Thailand to help trace his whereabouts.

== Death ==
After a 30-month police manhunt for Lim Keng Peng, who spent his time seeking shelter at construction sites and secretly working odd-jobs, the police finally obtained information of his whereabouts upon an informant's tip-off.

On 3 May 1988, Lim was seen having a drink at a coffee shop in Sunset Way, Clementi. At the coffee shop, Lim was confronted by three policemen, and even though the officers ambushed Lim in an attempt to arrest him, Lim violently struggled and aimed his gun at the policemen, who all fired a total of nine shots at Lim, killing him. Lim Keng Peng was 35 years old when he died. A .22 Smith and Wesson revolver (which contained four live rounds), some clothes and a screwdriver were found on him when he was killed.

When she was asked about Lim's death, Detective Goh's widow stated that ever since receiving the news, her bitterness over the loss of her husband faded and she found closure. Lim was eventually cremated at a Buddhist temple in Bright Hill, after his family recovered his remains from the mortuary, and Lim's siblings delayed passing the news of Lim's death to their 57-year-old mother, who was overseas at the time her eldest son died; Lim's father was no longer alive at this point.

After his death, Lim's name was removed from the wanted list, and wanted gunman Khor Kok Soon (alias Ah Soon) replaced Lim as the No. 1 wanted criminal. 31-year-old Khor, a Singaporean citizen, has been on the run since 1984 for armed robbery and murder before he was caught in Malaysia in 2003, and he was subsequently extradited to Singapore, where he was tried and sentenced to death for illegal discharge of a firearm under the Arms Offences Act.

== Aftermath ==
After Lim's death, the police discovered that Lim was most likely the real killer behind the unsolved killing of Vincent Loke Kok Nam, because Lim's fingerprints and palm print were a match to those found on the abandoned motorcycle ridden by Loke's murderer, and the bullet that killed Loke was ascertained to come from Lim's revolver. Lim was also a left-handed shooter like the killer who shot Loke. Loke's wife was brought to the mortuary to see Lim's body, and she was certain that Lim was the person who killed her husband.

In December 1989, a coroner's court conducted a joint inquiry hearing of the murder cases of both Vincent Loke and Detective Goh Ah Khia, and simultaneously heard the death of Lim in the same inquiry. This hearing was attended by the families of Lim's two deceased victims, although Lim's mother did not want to attend the court session. At the end of the hearing, the coroner's verdict found Lim guilty of the two murders of Loke and Goh back in 1985, based on the evidence presented in the hearing. In the same verdict, Lim's death was ruled as a lawful killing, after the police officers who shot Lim were found to have rightly exercised their right to self-defence in the face of imminent risk of injury or death posed by Lim to the lives around him.

As for the officers who participated in the police ambush, they were praised for their bravery and professionalism, and awards were issued to those who played instrumental roles in ensuring the elimination of Lim.

Singaporean crime show Crimewatch re-enacted the case of Lim Keng Peng for the second time and aired it on television in June 2003.

In light of the 2015 police shooting incident, the case of Lim Keng Peng was recalled as one of the notable cases where a police officer discharged a firearm while in line of duty.

== See also ==
- Lim Ban Lim
- Capital punishment in Singapore
- List of Singapore police officers killed in the line of duty
