= Murder of Mohamed Azad =

1974 murder case of a Muslim Indian in Singapore

Mohamed Azad Mohamed Hussein
- Mohamed Azad, who was killed and disposed of in the ocean
- Born: Mohamed Azad s/o Mohamed Hussein; 1945; Singapore
- Died: 16 November 1974 (aged 29); Kallang, Singapore
- Cause of death: Murdered
- Other name: Mohamed Azod Mohamed Hussein
- Education: National University of Singapore (degree for Political science)
- Occupations: Magazine editor (before death); Police inspector (national service; former)
- Employer(s): Singapore Airlines (before death); Singapore Police Force (national service; former)
- Known for: Murder victim

Mohamed Azad s/o Mohamed Hussein, the editor of the Singapore Airlines's house magazine, was found murdered on 21 November 1974, five days after he was reported missing. Mohamed's body was discovered inside a gunny sack, with seven wounds on his head that were identified as the cause of his death. Soon after, a suspect was arrested for Mohamed Azad's murder, and that man was 59-year-old Nadarajah Govindasamy (N Govindasamy), the father of Mohamed Azad's fiancée Deva Kumari.

It was revealed that Nadarajah hated Mohamed Azad due to him being an Indian Muslim and had strongly disapproved of his daughter's engagement with Mohamed Azad. During the trial, Nadarajah made an unsworn statement that he was gravely provoked and lost control in killing Mohamed Azad, but the cold blooded nature of the crime, the evidence of his hatred towards Muslims and strong case of the prosecution weighed against Nadarajah's testimony and hence on 20 August 1975, Nadarajah was sentenced to death for, in the eyes of the judges, a "brutal and senseless" premeditated murder.

== Background ==
Mohamed Azad Mohamed Hussein, a political science graduate of National University of Singapore and former inspector of the Police National Service, first met Deva Kumari Govindasamy, then an arts undergraduate of the same university, in 1971. Deva Kumari, who first entered the university a year before, fell in love with Mohamed Azad, and both of them were eventually engaged in private. Only their two friends Myrna Thomas and M. Arunachalam knew about the couple's engagement. The fact that Mohamed was a Muslim Indian while Deva Kumari was a Hindu Indian did not hinder their romance. Mohamed Azad was working as an editor of an airlines magazine at the time he became engaged with Deva Kumari.

However, Deva Kumari's father Nadarajah Govindasamy, owner of a transport company, objected to the relationship between Mohamed Azad and his daughter, due to his strong adverse feelings against Islam and his conservative beliefs. At the time of Deva Kumari's relationship with Mohamed Azad, she was estranged from her father due to him disliking her for often hanging out with young men under the perception that she was not behaving well. Then, a month after first seeing Mohamed Azad, Nadarajah met up with Mohamed Azad, apologising to him and allowed him to be together with his daughter. However, in November 1974, Nadarajah would be arrested for killing Mohamed Azad for the alleged motive of his disapproval of his daughter's engagement with him.

== Murder ==
On 16 November 1974, Mohamed Azad did not turn up for the scheduled dinner meeting he had with Deva Kumari, Myrna and Arunachalam. Arunachalam went to search for Mohamed Azad, and he received word from Mohamed Azad's brother Mohamed Anwar that Mohamed was not at home either. Later, he and Myrna went to visit Deva Kumari's father Nadarajah, asking him about Mohamed Azad's whereabouts. Earlier on, while Arunachalam was having lunch with Mohamed Azad, Deva Kumari and Myrna, he heard from Mohamed Azad that Nadarajah asked to meet up to show him Deva Kumari's diary, which contained entries that expressed her feelings for Mohamed Azad. Although all three of them advised Mohamed Azad to not meet Nadarajah and Deva Kumari also added that she did not have such a diary, Mohamed Azad went ahead with the meeting with Nadarajah before the scheduled dinner meeting with the trio. However, Nadarajah only calmly said that Mohamed Azad stayed at his house for twenty minutes and left after having a drink, and asked Arunachalam to see if he was probably with Deva Kumari. However, Mohamed Azad remained uncontactable and he was therefore reported missing to the authorities.

On 21 November 1974, five days after Mohamed Azad disappeared, a gunny sack was discovered washed up to shore from the ocean near Kallang Basin. A decomposing body was discovered stuffed inside the sack, and it was identified to be 29-year-old Mohamed Azad Mohamed Hussein. According to the pathologist, Mohamed Azad's skull had gaping wounds, and out of the total of 14 head injuries, seven were fatal and they were all inflicted with great force. It was established that Mohamed Azad died for at least four to five days, and his hands and legs were also tied up. V. N. Retna Singam, the Deputy Commissioner of Police, was shocked to hear that Mohamed Azad was killed, and he remembered Mohamed Azad as one who meritoriously and meticulously discharged his duties during his time as an inspector of the Police National Service. Mohamed Azad's father was also devastated to hear that his son was killed.

Later, Nadarajah was among those brought into questioning by the police over the death of Mohamed Azad. He was later arrested and charged with murder on 23 November 1974, and also confessed to killing Mohamed Azad due to an alleged argument.

== Trial and execution ==
=== Court proceedings ===
Nadarajah Govindasamy, who was charged with killing Mohamed Azad, his daughter's fiancé.

On 12 August 1975, 59-year-old Nadarajah Govindasamy stood trial at the High Court for the charge of murdering Mohamed Azad in November 1974. Deputy Public Prosecutor (DPP) Lawrence Ang was in charge of the prosecution, while N. Ganesan represented Nadarajah as his defence counsel. Nadarajah's case was heard by two trial judges - Justice Choor Singh and Justice Frederick Arthur Chua (also known as F. A. Chua). Deva Kumari, Myrna and Arunachalam turned up as witnesses for the prosecution. While she took the stand, Deva Kumari was shown a red book, which she admitted was her diary but she rarely used it as her diary, and instead penned her lecture notes inside that book before she subsequently passed it to her sister for doing some homework.

Nadarajah refused to go to the stand to give his defence or undergo a cross-examination. He made an unsworn statement on the dock, claiming that he was gravely provoked into killing Mohamed. He explained that when Mohamed came to his house and they had a conversation, he was hurt by Mohamed's alleged insults of his religion and himself, and thus he began to assault Mohamed and they got into a fight, before Nadarajah picked up a chopper and hacked Mohamed to death. He also added that he was confused and dazed as he stuffed Mohamed's corpse inside a sack and threw it into the sea near Kallang Basin. Nadarajah's lawyer N. Ganesan argued that his client should not be held fully culpable for committing murder since he was under a sudden and grave provocation and therefore had lost his self-control at the time he chopped Mohamed to death and as such, Ganesan stated that Nadarajah's charge of murder should be reduced to culpable homicide not amounting to murder.

In his closing submissions however, DPP Lawrence Ang directed the court's attention to the utter brutality, violence and cold-blooded nature of the murder, pointing out that Nadarajah had deliberately omitted and skipped the major parts of his story and never gave any detail on whether there was any retaliation from Mohamed Azad during the supposed fight the men had with each other, whether if Mohamed Azad tried to run, and whether if there was any struggle for the chopper, and how coincidental it was for Nadarajah to have a chopper within his reach, and also cited the witnesses' account of Nadarajah's calm demeanour at the questions of Mohamed Azad's whereabouts. Thus, DPP Ang argued it could only be inferred that there was no grave or sudden provocation by Mohamed Azad, and that Nadarajah had cruelly and mercilessly used the chopper to hack Mohamed Azad to death after luring him to his home under the false excuse of showing him his daughter's "diary". As such, DPP Ang argued that Nadarajah's defence of sudden and grave provocation should be rejected, and therefore he should be convicted for the premeditated murder of Mohamed Azad.

=== Death penalty ===
On 20 August 1975, both the High Court judges – Justice Choor Singh and Justice F. A. Chua – delivered their judgement, with Justice Chua pronouncing it in court. Justice Chua stated that the judges were of the opinion that in contrast to Nadarajah's claims, the death of Mohamed Azad was the product of a "brutal and senseless" murder, and he admonished Nadarajah for having caused permanent harm to Mohamed's family and his own daughter, by ruthlessly killing off his daughter's beloved man who had a promising future. He stated that there was clear evidence that Nadarajah had intended to commit premeditated murder by inflicting not just one, but seven fatal wounds on Mohamed Azad's head in the most violent and beastly manner, and that the prosecution's case was overpowering against him even in the absence of his unsworn statement. Nadarajah was therefore found guilty of murder, and sentenced to death, a sentence which Justice Chua stated was the "one sentence the court could impose" in the case.

According to 24-year-old Deva Kumari, she was devastated over the court verdict (which her landlady passed on to her on behalf of her family), and she stated that she was in a huge heartbreak since the day her father violently murdered her fiancé (whom she dearly loved), and stated she was unable to go face and visit her father in prison. Nadarajah's 51-year-old wife and 11-year-old youngest daughter Geetah were also saddened at the judgement; relatives noted that Geetah was forced to mature at an early age because of her father's atrocity and the need to take care of her mother in his absence. As of the time Nadarajah was sentenced to hang, his three other children were all outside Singapore: his 26-year-old son Bala was married to a French and studying mathematics in India while his two other daughters - 22-year-old Rajakumari and 31-year-old Indrakumari - are studying and working in England respectively. An acquaintance of Mohamed Azad reportedly stated that two days before his death, while celebrating Deepavali, Mohamed Azad kept asking questions about what happen to people after their deaths, which seemed to be a premonition of his death. Mohamed's sister also stated that prior to his death, Mohamed was poring over books about afterlife and death.

Six months later, Nadarajah's appeal was dismissed by the Court of Appeal on 17 February 1976, as they also disagreed with the defence counsel that Nadarajah indeed lost self control and killed Mohamed Azad in a fit of uncontrollable anger. Likewise, Deva Kumari was not at court to hear the verdict, as she was away in Europe. Nadarajah's death row plea for leave to appeal to the Privy Council in London was also rejected in July 1976.

On the Friday morning of 28 January 1977, 60-year-old Nadarajah Govindasamy was hanged at Changi Prison. On the same date of Nadarajah's execution, 23-year-old soto seller and armed robber Talib bin Haji Hamzah was hanged at the same prison for using a firearm to commit robbery, therefore becoming the second person executed for a conviction under the newly enacted Arms Offences Act, where it mete out capital punishment for the use of firearms to commit a crime.

== Aftermath ==
On 8 November 2004, thirty years after the murder of Mohamed Azad, Singaporean crime show True Files re-enacted the case, and the episode aired as the third episode of the show's third season. Nadarajah's former lawyer N. Ganesan was interviewed in the episode, and according to the producers of the show, nobody knew the whereabouts of Deva Kumari or the rest of Nadarajah's family. Ganesan believed that Deva Kumari and her family had left the country as he never saw them again after Nadarajah was executed. Subhas Anandan, the veteran criminal lawyer of Singapore, revealed in the episode that he was a friend of the victim, and he defended Mohamed Azad by clarifying that Mohamed Azad was not a bad person as Nadarajah painted him to be, and he said that the victim visited his fiancée's father with the intention to get approval from him to marry his daughter and reconcile their differences rather than argue with him.

N. Sivanandan, the Indian court interpreter of Nadarajah's trial who retired in the 2010s after five decades on his job, wrote a book about the past high-profile cases where he acted as the interpreter at trial. Among these cases include Nadarajah's trial, and others like Nadasan Chandra Secharan (who was charged but acquitted of killing his lover), the 2013 Little India riot court case, and taxi driver G. Krishnasamy Naidu who suffered from morbid jealousy when he killed his wife by decapitation for her infidelity.

Between January and November 1974, over 57 murders occurred in Singapore. The murder of Mohamed Azad was remembered as one of the most brutal cases of murder to have occurred in Singapore during the 1970s.

== See also ==
- Capital punishment in Singapore
- List of solved missing person cases: 1950–1999
