= Lim Chwee Soon =

Singaporean convicted armed robber and gunman

- Police mugshot of Lim Chwee Soon, first taken in 1995
- Born: Lim Chwee Soon; 1 January 1967; Singapore
- Died: 25 July 1997 (aged 30); Changi Prison, Singapore
- Cause of death: Execution by hanging
- Other name: Ah Soon
- Occupation: Unemployed
- Parent(s): Goh Lian Chun (mother); Unnamed father
- Status: Executed
- Conviction: Illegal use of a firearm to commit robbery (one count)
- Criminal charges: Illegal use of a firearm to commit robbery
- Penalty: Death

Lim Chwee Soon (林水顺 Lín Shuǐshùn; 1 January 1967 – 25 July 1997), alias Ah Soon, was a Singaporean armed robber who committed a total of three armed robberies between June and October 1995. In his latest robbery, Lim used his gun, a Colt .45, to fire seven shots and three of them caused severe injury to How Sau Che, the sales manager of the goldsmith shop robbed by Lim at the People's Park Complex on 30 October 1995.

Lim, who stole four Rolex watches worth S$80,000, fled to Malaysia immediately after the crime but was arrested two days later, and extradited back to Singapore for trial. While his accomplices in the previous robberies were sentenced to prison and caning, Lim was sentenced to death for the most serious charge of using a firearm under the Arms Offences Act on 24 July 1996. After his appeals were dismissed, Lim was hanged on 25 July 1997.

== Biography ==
Lim Chwee Soon was born in 1967 as the second child of a seaman and a coffee shop assistant. He had one older brother, two younger sisters and one younger brother. Lim was reportedly obsessed with toy guns when he was young. His mother described him as an obedient boy during his childhood. After Lim reached adulthood, he would work and send some money to his mother occasionally.

During his youth however, Lim was involved in several misendeavours, including with the law itself. He assaulted a policeman when he was Secondary Four, and therefore placed under probation. He also stole a bayonet and diving knife from some soldiers at one point, and even feigned illness for several times when posted to the Construction Brigade, due to his unhappiness of working as a construction worker. During his time in National Service, in exchange for a long medical leave despite nearing the end of his military service, Lim even broke his finger with a hammer and lied that he injured it from a fall.

== 1995 crime spree ==
=== First armed robbery ===
On 22 June 1995, 28-year-old Lim Chwee Soon, who armed himself with an axe, entered the Kee Hing Hung Rolex boutique at People's Park Complex to commit robbery. However, it was a poorly executed attempt as he was quickly subdued by the employees of the goldsmith shop, who all used chairs to hit Lim and restrained him. Lim was therefore charged with the attempted armed robbery. However, while Lim was temporarily out of jail on bail, he jumped bail in August 1995 and escaped to both Malaysia and Thailand. It was further revealed that Lim was also involved in two cases of snatch-theft in July 1995 while on bail.

=== Second armed robbery ===
On 28 October 1995, Lim returned to Singapore, with two new pistols he bought during his life on the run. He and his friend Lau Ah Meng (alias Ah Tee; 刘亚明 Líu Yàmíng) met up with Lim's 30-year-old brother Lim Kang Hee (林康喜 Lín Kāngxǐ), who agreed to commit robbery with his younger brother and friend. The robbery was made due to the need to help Kang Hee to discharge the debts he owed to loan sharks. The next day, the trio held a moneychanger Lam Wei Yue at gunpoint at City Plaza. But the trio only made off with a bag of rubbish.

=== Third armed robbery ===
On 30 October 1995, the next day after his second robbery, Lim Chwee Soon once again commit armed robbery. This time round, he returned to the Kee Hing Hung Rolex boutique at People's Park Complex, where he targeted for the first time in June 1995, for a second robbery attempt. Upon entering the shop, Lim shouted "Robbery" in Hokkien and threatened the five people - consisting of the owner's two sons, their aunt and their two employees - at gunpoint before he fired seven shots, with three of them causing injury to 35-year-old How Sau Che (侯绍智 Hóu Shàozhì), the shop manager and elder son of the shop owner. After firing his gun, Lim used a hammer to smash the glass and grab four Rolex watches before he ran off. How managed to survive with timely medical intervention.

After leaving the shop, Lim got onto the motorcycle of Lau, who acted as a lookout, and together, both men escaped. After which, both Lim and Lau escaped to Malaysia after crossing the Woodlands Checkpoint, with Lim stealing his brother's passport to leave for Malaysia.

Meanwhile, the police began their investigations in the case, and after interviewing the witnesses and victim, therefore sent out a public appeal for information to facilitate investigations and Lim's arrest. They also informed the Malaysian authorities to assist them in tracing the robbers' whereabouts.

== Arrest and extradition ==
=== Capture in Kuala Lumpur ===
On 1 November 1995, 28-year-old Lim Chwee Soon was arrested by the Royal Malaysia Police at a hotel in Kuala Lumpur. Inside Lim's hotel room, the Malaysian officers discovered a total of two Colt .45 semi-automatic pistols and a hundred rounds of ammunition, including nine hollow-point bullets. The four Rolex watches stolen by Lim during the latest robbery case were also recovered from the room. The Singaporean authorities were immediately informed of Lim's arrest. 40-year-old Lau Ah Meng was similarly arrested during a gun raid at his girlfriend's flat in Sentul.

The Malaysian police treated Lim's case as one of illegal possession of firearms, and they were considering charges of arms possession against Lim, who would possibly be sentenced to mandatory life imprisonment and caning in Malaysia if convicted of the offence under the Malaysian firearms law. However, in the course of investigations, the Malaysian police agreed to have discussions with the Singaporean police with regards to Lim's possible extradition to Singapore for the charges he was wanted for, the most serious of which would warrant the death penalty in Singapore.

In that same month itself, the Malaysian authorities discovered another fugitive wanted by Singapore, but unlike both Lim and Lau, the 39-year-old Singaporean, Chua Khee Wah (alias Ah Keong), was gunned down by the Malaysian police after he resisted arrest and engaged in a gunfight with the Malaysian cops, who discovered him in his hiding place at Kuala Lumpur. Chua, who was one of Singapore's top ten most wanted criminals, was wanted for the 1992 murders of 42-year-old female coffee shop owner Lim Tee Jong and 27-year-old prison warden Karamjit Singh at Upper Changi.

=== Extradition and charges ===
On 13 November 1995, Lim and Lau were both extradited back to Singapore. Lim was charged with discharging his pistol seven times and having caused hurt to How Sau Che, as well as armed robbery, and would be sentenced to death if found guilty. Lau was charged with abetting Lim to commit armed robbery and shooting. As he was abetting Lim with the knowledge that Lim possessed a firearm and knowingly abetted the use of a firearm, Lau would also be sentenced to the gallows as well. Both men also faced additional charges for the previous robberies and thefts they committed prior to the latest crime Lim got involved in.

Meanwhile, Lim's elder brother Lim Kang Hee was also arrested and charged for his involvement in the second armed robbery committed by his younger brother. Kang Hee also faced additional charges for another unrelated robbery, which he committed with another man, as well as three other cases of theft.

The arrest of her two elder sons was a huge emotional blow for Lim's mother, who was unable to understand why did both of them went astray and embark on a life of crime despite being obedient children when young. Lim's mother did not tell her husband for fear he may encounter an accident at his workplace, and hoped that her other three children, who were still of school-going age, did not end up like their two older brothers.

=== Fates of Lim's brother and Lau ===
On 2 July 1996, 41-year-old Lau Ah Meng, who was charged in the same case with Lim, was allowed to plead guilty to two reduced charges, one of committing armed robbery at City Plaza with Lim on 29 October and helping Lim escape the goldsmith shop on 30 October. Lau also faced other charges of consorting with a person armed with a firearm and stealing motorcycles. Lau, in his mitigation plea, stated that he only helped Lim to repay him for the act of kindness Lim did to him. In 1993, two years before his crime, Lau lost his job and it led to his wife divorcing him and taking custody of their three children and left him. It was Lim, whom he met in prison, helped him to find employment and he made a living as a hawker. Subsequently, Lau was sentenced to nine years' imprisonment and twelve strokes of the cane, plus a concurrent term of eight years for the robberies. During sentencing, Justice M P H Rubin reportedly told Lau that he was fortunate to have escaped the gallows after the prosecution decided to review his case and reduced the charges against him.

For his previous thefts and the robbery he helped his younger brother Lim Chwee Soon to commit, 31-year-old Lim Kang Hee was sentenced to a total of eight years' imprisonment and 24 strokes of the cane on 13 May 1996. Kang Hee's accomplice Yeo Choon Seng, a 34-year-old deliveryman who was involved in one of the thefts committed by Kang Hee, was given a sentence of four years' jail and six strokes of the cane on 3 April 1996.

== Trial of Lim Chwee Soon ==
=== Court proceedings ===
Lim Chwee Soon's trial began at the High Court on 15 July 1996. Lim was represented by both lawyers Edward De'Souza and Ong Peng Boon, while Lim Jen Hui and Lee Sing Lit were in charge of prosecuting Lim. Justice T. S. Sinnathuray presided the trial hearing. During the trial itself, the victim How Sau Che was one of the witnesses who testified for the prosecution, and the CCTV camera footage that captured the robbery itself were also presented as evidence. Lim initially tried to argue that his statements were made involuntarily but subsequently, the judge overruled that the statements should be admitted as evidence.

In his defence, Lim claimed that he accidentally fired the gun several times when he thought someone tried to hit him, and claimed that he never meant to shoot anyone since he held the gun in his right hand (Lim was left-handed). Lim even engaged a psychiatrist Douglas Kong to help him testify that he was suffering from diminished responsibility, due to a brain damage resulting from a childhood injury and a "pervasive disorder from development". However, in rebuttal, the prosecution's psychiatrist Tan Soo Teng testified that Lim never suffered from an abnormality of the mind when he committed the robbery and shot How Sau Che. Despite Dr Tan's diagnosis that Lim suffered from anti-social personality disorder, Lim was still mentally sound at the time of the offence, and Dr Tan even cited Lim's troublemaking acts during his childhood, youth and National Service in his psychiatric report. The gun experts' test-firing of the gun also concluded that the gun did not malfunction and it never misfired unlike what Lim claimed.

=== Death penalty ===
On 24 July 1996, the trial judge T. S. Sinnathuray delivered his verdict after a five-day trial.

In his judgement, Justice Sinnathuray rejected Lim Chwee Soon's defence of diminished responsibility, find that he was of sound mind when he fired the shots and committed the armed robbery on 30 October 1995. He also found that Lim did intend to use his firearm to commit robbery and cause hurt, and the case was overwhelmingly against him due to the CCTV footage that captured the robbery and the numerous eyewitnesses accounts, and therefore his other defence of accidental shooting was also rejected as well.

Justice Sinnathuray found 29-year-old Lim Chwee Soon guilty and sentenced him to death under the Arms Offences Act. Lim became the first person to be sentenced to death under the amended Arms Offences Act, where the death penalty was mandated for the use or attempted use of a firearm to commit an offence. Another first case was that of Ng Theng Shuang, a Malaysian gunman who discharged a firearm and injured a security officer and two other bystanders during a 1992 robbery attempt. Ng was convicted for unlawfully discharging his firearm in September 1994, and hanged on 14 July 1995.

Reportedly, Lim's mother was devastated at the verdict and had to be helped by her relatives when leaving the courtroom. Lim, on the other hand, was impassive in his reaction to the sentence.

== Execution ==
Subsequently, Lim appealed against his sentence, but Chief Justice Yong Pung How and two other judges - L P Thean and M Karthigesu - of the Court of Appeal dismissed the appeal on 18 November 1996, after they similarly rejected Lim's claims of diminished responsibility and accidental shooting, and disagreed with Lim's lawyer Peter Fernando, who tried to argue that the trial judge failed to duly consider Lim's psychiatric evidence before reaching the verdict.

On 25 July 1997, 30-year-old Lim Chwee Soon was hanged in Changi Prison at dawn.

In the aftermath, Singaporean crime show Crimewatch re-enacted the case of Lim and it was aired in September 1997 as the seventh episode of its annual season.

== See also ==
- Khor Kok Soon
- Ng Theng Shuang
- Arms Offences Act
- Capital punishment in Singapore
