= Andrew Road triple murder =

1983 high-profile triple murder case in Singapore

- Date: 23 July 1983; 43 years ago
- Location: Andrew Road, Singapore
- Participants: Sek Kim Wah, 19 years old (murder); Nyu Kok Meng, 19 years old (armed robbery)

The Andrew Road triple murder was a case of robbery turned murder in a bungalow at Andrew Road, Singapore, in 1983. The robbery was committed by two young men, Sek Kim Wah and Nyu Kok Meng, armed with a rifle and knife. During the robbery, Sek murdered three of the five hostages while the Nyu protected the remaining two hostages from his partner. Eventually both were arrested, with Sek charged with murder and hanged while Nyu, who did not take part in the killings, receiving a life sentence and caning for armed robbery. It was further revealed in police investigations that Sek was also responsible for an unrelated double murder of two more victims, whom he killed using the same modus operandi as for the Andrew Road victims. He is seen as the first and only serial killer in Singapore to date, albeit Adrian Lim killed three victims in three separate instances.

== Crime ==
=== Armed robbery ===
On the morning of 23 July 1983, at around 8 am, 10-year-old Dawn Jacinta Tay Aishan (Chinese: 郑爱姗), the youngest daughter of 61-year-old retired businessman Robert Tay Bak Hong (Chinese: 郑木丰), was roller-skating outside her house while waiting for her Mandarin tutor, Madam Tang So Ha (Chinese: 邓淑霞) to arrive to give her lessons. At around the same time, two houses away, two young men were fixing their motorcycle. The tutor arrived at the house thirty minutes later.

Forty minutes after the arrival of Dawn's tutor, the two men seen repairing the motorcycle - 19-year-olds National Serviceman Sek Kim Wah and Malaysian Nyu Kok Meng - saw the front gate of Dawn's bungalow left open. They took out a loaded M16 rifle (which Sek had stolen from Nee Soon military camp where he served his National Service) and brandished a knife before barging into the bungalow, first taking the Tay family's Filipino domestic helper Jovita Sandrina Virador (nicknamed Duby, also spelled Jovita Merador, Jovita Verador, Jovita Verazor or Jovita Mirador), aged 27, hostage. They entered the house with Jovita and used the rifle to threaten Dawn, Tang, and Dawn's 40 or 45-year-old mother Annie Low Au Ie (Chinese: 刘爱仪), forcing them inside a room before tying them up. One of the men forced Dawn to call her father, who was in the back garden; Robert Tay was lured into the room and tied up as well.

After telling Sek where to find her jewelry, Low was told to write a cheque for $5000, which was immediately taken by Sek to the bank to cash while Nyu stayed behind to guard the hostages. Feeling sorry for the tutor, whose head was covered in a plastic bag, he removed it for her. Sek returned with the money but was not satisfied with the loot they had, so he took Tay to the bank with him to withdraw more cash. During the time Sek was out with Tay, Nyu told the women that he would not harm them, as it was his first robbery and he had no intention to harm anyone. At the request of Low, Nyu shook hands with Dawn as a promise to not hurt them.

=== Triple murder ===
Murder victims
Robert Tay

Annie Low

Jovita Virador

Sek later returned with $7,000. After gagging the victims and taking Tay, Low, and Jovita into separate rooms, the robbers continued to ransack the house. Afraid of leaving behind witnesses, Sek secretly decided to murder all the hostages. He first used a raffia string to strangle Tay, before using a wooden stool to repeatedly bludgeon him until he was dead, fracturing his skull. He entered the master bedroom, where he strangled Jovita and Low, again using a wooden stool to repeatedly strike Low's covered head.

After being alerted by the thumping sounds in the house and witnessing Sek's actions, Nyu armed himself with the rifle and locked himself in the room with Dawn and her tutor, intending to protect the surviving hostages. Sek later returned to the room where Nyu, Dawn, and Tang were hiding and demanded that Nyu let him in to murder the remaining hostages, actually intending to also kill Nyu. Nyu adamantly refused and asked Sek why would he commit murder when he had already robbed the victims of their money, and told Sek to leave. After a heated row between the two men, Sek left the house in Tay's Mercedes car with the loot.

Nyu then released both Dawn and Tang and told them to run away, informing them of the murder of Dawn's parents and maid and furnishing them with Sek's address. He drew a map of the area where Sek lived in on an envelope and gave it to Tang, who was afraid that Nyu still might harm her and her student and secretly armed herself with a small knife. Nyu also gave her his Malaysian identity card, telling her to help him buy a coffin and inform his parents and grandmother that he was sorry, as he wanted to commit suicide. He also asked Tang to bury him next to his deceased best friend Lau Beng Hiong (Chinese: 刘明雄), whose Chinese name he wrote inside Dawn's exercise book before giving it to her.

Nyu wanted her to repeat his requests, and despite her fear of Nyu, Tang tried to dissuade Nyu from committing suicide. It was only when Nyu pointed the rifle at her that Tang fled the house with Dawn (who saw her parents' bodies) to a neighbour's house to contact the police. Nyu tried to shoot himself twice, but failed, as he did not know how to use the rifle. Frustrated, Nyu fled the bungalow, but not before leaving behind the rifle and stolen ammunition, for fear that Sek would murder more people. He met up with Sek in another safe place that afternoon to divide the loot. Nyu later left Singapore on that night itself for Malaysia using a friend's passport, while Sek remained in Singapore.

=== Arrests ===
Meanwhile, the police arrived at the bungalow and searched the house for the robbers, but they could only find the bodies. The case was assigned to Inspector P. Sathasivam of the Criminal Investigation Department. The police knew that Tay, a father of eight adult children (including one foster son) and a grandfather of five grandchildren, had a reputation of being a generous and virtuous businessman who had helped ex-convicts to reintegrate into society by providing them work at the factory, hence they ruled out the possibility of a revenge killing. With Nyu's Malaysian identity card and the map drawn by Nyu, the police managed to arrest Sek six days later at his elder sister Sek Yoke Mui's flat on 29 July 1983. Unable to cope with his guilt, Nyu surrendered himself to the police three days after Sek's arrest and was extradited back to Singapore on 3 August 1983. Both men were charged with murder.

== Background of the robbers ==
=== Sek Kim Wah ===
Sek Kim Wah

Sek Kim Wah (Traditional Chinese: 薛金華; Simplified Chinese: 薛金华; Pinyin: Xuē Jīnhuá) was a Singaporean born sometime between 18 March and 23 July 1964. The details of his early childhood and life before the murders are based on the court testimonies given by family members and Sek himself. Sek came from a broken family, in which he grew up under neglectful parents with an elder brother Sek Kim Siong (born in 1962), an elder sister Sek Yoke Mui (born in 1963) and Sek Nyuk Ngok (born in 1966). His father Sek Yuon Chin was said to be a heavy and compulsive gambler who was rarely home and later left the family to live with a mistress in Ang Mo Kio when Sek was 9. Similarly, Sek's mother Hoh Mooi Chai also left the family to have an affair with a married man. Another aggravating factor was the children's separation from their grandparents after a heated quarrel between their mother and the grandparents, resulting in the couple's four young children, who were not close to each other, fending for themselves and stealing to survive.

Sek, who only attended four years of primary school before dropping out due to financial reasons, was said to have been an ill-behaved child. His sister Sek Yoke Mui said that he was obsessed with Wuxia novels and Kungfu movies in his childhood and had molested his younger sister Nyuk Ngok at age 12. Sek was also said to enjoy injuring himself at times, describing it as thrilling. He and his elder brother Kim Siong fought with other students in school, and both had bad, impulsive tempers. There was one occasion when both brothers were chained at home for stealing a bicycle and fighting. Eventually, Kim Siong was jailed in a boys' home for theft, and was jailed a second time for going AWOL during his National Service. It was at this point, Kim Siong claimed, he started to reconsider his life choices and decided to turn over a new leaf and be more mature; as a result, he restarted his education and later found a stable job as an electrician a few years later.

On the other hand, Sek Kim Wah, who became a secret society member at age 13 by joining a gang called "Gi It San", was sentenced to 4 years in a boys' home in 1979 for theft. He was paroled in 1981 for good behaviour and joined the army a year later to serve his National Service. It was on 30 June 1983 when he first committed murder: he robbed and killed 42-year-old illegal bookmaker Lim Khee Sin (Chinese: 林庚申) and his 32-year-old bar waitress girlfriend Ong Ah Hong (Chinese: 王亚凤) somewhere in East Coast Park, strangling them in the same way he strangled the victims at Andrew Road. He dumped their bodies at the Seletar Reservoir dirt track after stealing Lim's driving license. This case remained unsolved until Sek himself confessed to it after his arrest.

Sometime in 1981, while he was still in the boys' home, Sek was assigned work planting orchids in the garden of the household of Robert Tay. He was also given temporary employment in Tay's factory. It was this that led Sek to want to rob the wealthy businessman.

=== Nyu Kok Meng ===
Nyu Kok Meng (Traditional Chinese: 饒國明; Simplified Chinese: 饶国明; Pinyin: Ráo Guómíng) is a Malaysian born sometime between 24 July 1963 and 23 July 1964. Nyu was the sixth of eight children. His 62-year-old father worked as a driver in Singapore. His hometown was in Pekan Nanas, Johor.

According to Nyu's 42-year-old mother, her son was originally a well-behaved and helpful child, always working part-time in a rubber plantation while studying in secondary school to provide money for the family. Nyu eventually dropped out of school due to financial difficulties and having no time to study. After this, Nyu went to work in a bakery nearby his hometown and became the caretaker of his boss's children, sending money to his family monthly before he left Malaysia to work as a welder in Singapore in 1981.

It was there when Nyu gradually began to go astray, as he began to befriend and interact with secret society members and ignored his family's advice to not do so. One of the society members would later become his best friend, Lau Beng Hiong, whom Nyu told Tang he wanted to be buried with. Lau, who was 18 when he died, was killed by four members of a rival gang during a gang fight on 22 May 1983, two months before the Andrew Road murders. Nyu, who had only met Sek a few days before, agreed to take part in the robbery after Sek asked him.

== Nyu Kok Meng's trial ==
Both Sek Kim Wah and Nyu Kok Meng were initially set to stand trial for murder together. But on 8 July 1985, the prosecution, having gone through the details of the case, decided to withdraw the triple murder charges against Nyu, and instead charged him with committing armed robbery with a firearm under the Arms Offences Act, which Nyu pleaded guilty to and was convicted of. The next day, Nyu Kok Meng, who was represented by prominent lawyer Leo Fernando, was sentenced to life imprisonment and 6 strokes of the cane by High Court judge Punch Coomaraswamy, who took note of Nyu's remorse, his full cooperation with the police and the fact that he had surrendered himself.

Since a life sentence under Singapore law at that time was a jail term of 20 years (before the landmark judgement of Abdul Nasir bin Amer Hamsah's appeal on 20 August 1997, which changed the definition of life imprisonment to a term of incarceration for the rest of a prisoner's natural life, with an entitlement for parole after serving at least 20 years), by maintaining good conduct while in prison, Nyu would be released sometime between December 1996 and November 1998 after serving at least two-thirds of his life term (13 years and 4 months), depending on when he started to serve his life sentence. By the end of 2005, Nyu Kok Meng had been released from jail and presumably returned to Malaysia. (Note: There were no reports of Nyu Kok Meng's life after his release. His death date is unconfirmed as a result.)

== Sek Kim Wah's trial ==
=== The prosecution's case ===
On 22 July 1985, nearly two years after the Andrew Road triple homicide, 21-year-old Sek Kim Wah, who was represented by state-assigned defense lawyer Loh Lin Kok, stood trial in the High Court before two High Court judges, Lai Kew Chai (who would deliver judgement on child murderer Took Leng How for the high-profile murder of 8-year-old Huang Na 20 years later) and Abdul Wahab Ghows, for the murders. Additionally, Sek faced two separate murder charges for the deaths of Lim Khee Sin and Ong Ah Hong, for which he would stand trial at a later date. The trial attracted much public attention due to the sensational nature of the case. The prosecution, led by Deputy Public Prosecutors Roy Neighbor and Tan Siong Thye, called on Sek's former accomplice Nyu Kok Meng, who agreed to testify for the prosecution. Similarly, the two survivors of the Andrew Road case also took the stand to recount what happened on the day itself.

Sixteen other witnesses, including the employees of the bank where Sek went to cash the cheque, also took the stand. Professor Chao Tzee Cheng, the pathologist who examined the bodies of the three victims, testified that both women died from strangulation, and that they had been strangled with great force. He also testified that the reason for Tay's death was a fractured skull sustained from Sek's repeated blows to his head. Lily Tay Noi Hiang (unrelated to the Tay family in the Andrew Road case), a 21-year-old lounge hostess from the Golden Sultan Lounge and Sek's claimed girlfriend, was also a witness for the prosecution. She testified that Sek, whom she first met on 14 July 1983, had boasted to her about not just the murders he committed at Andrew Road, but also the unsolved East Coast Park murders. He had also told her he wanted to surpass Singapore's most notorious gunman Lim Ban Lim, who had been wanted in the 1960s and 1970s for killing a police officer in 1968 and many other crimes but was eventually gunned down by police in late November 1972.

When Lily Tay asked Sek if he was afraid of killing, he said no as he had killed five people, before laughing. She also said that Sek tried to impress her with gifts and wanted to make her his girlfriend, but she refused because she already had a boyfriend and to her, Sek was merely a customer. Ng Hien Chong, alias Ah Tiong, a bouncer who had worked in the same lounge as Lily Tay, also testified that Sek had told him about the five murders he committed. Lily Tay had once asked Ng if they should inform the police, but Ng declined to do so, stating that Sek could have been lying about his killings.

=== Defence case ===
==== Sek's testimony ====
Sek Kim Wah took the stand on 26 July 1985. Initially blaming Nyu Kok Meng for killing one of the victims and stating he had no intention to kill, Sek later admitted on the stand that he had murdered all three victims, but claimed diminished responsibility. When he was asked how he felt when strangling Annie Low, Sek brought up an incident in 1980 or 1981 when he had been strangled by someone at the Singapore Boys' Home until he blacked out. Sek said, "At first I felt discomfort. Then it was very thrilling... as if the lights were being switched on and off." He described feeling thrilled when he strangled his victims, and stated he enjoyed it. He also said he wanted to electrocute the victims but forgot to turn on the electricity, and hence he electrocuted the goldfish in Tay's bungalow instead. When asked by Justice Lai why he did that, Sek said he did not know, but said the more he tried everything, the more thrilling it became. Additionally, he told the court why he killed the victims: he said Robert Tay had recognized his voice and face; Sek was initially elated at Tay's recognition but eventually it occurred to him that he had to silence the victims. Not only did he recount how he strangled the couple at East Coast Park the month before he killed the three victims at Andrew Road, Sek also said in court that he wanted to be like Rambo, the hero in the film First Blood, with whom Sek identified as a good person wrongfully accused by the police. He even said he wanted to kill at least 15 policemen, due to his hatred of them.

Sek also brought up his painful, unhappy childhood, blaming his parents for being uncaring and irresponsible, and for making him the person he had become. He expressed no love or care for his father, and no love for his mother (though he claimed more or less concern for her well-being). His family members - his parents and brother in particular - took the stand and their testimonies partially corroborated Sek's own account of his childhood. Sek's parents said that what Sek claimed was generally true, though they added that they had told him and their other children to not be bad children; while testifying in court, they expressed their remorse for not paying more attention to their children's well-being and education.

The defense also raised another incident that supposedly pushed Sek over the edge and culminated in the murders. Sek was said to be suffering unrequited love for a coffee shop owner's daughter. About three days before he killed Lim Khee Sin and Ong Ah Hong, she had sent him a letter which made Sek believe that she had rejected his feelings for her. Sek claimed,

After receiving the letter I had the impression that there was no one to supervise me and I could do whatever I liked. I was frustrated. I like someone to exercise control over me, to care and look after me. But all they are interested in is money. Since everybody is busy about money, I would get it by hook or by crook and the more the merrier.

==== Sek's defence of diminished responsibility ====
Sek Kim Wah's lawyer, Loh Lin Kok, called upon two psychiatric experts, Australian psychiatrist Dr. John Ellard and noted Singaporean psychiatrist Dr. Wong Yip Chong (who acted as expert witness to support the defence of diminished responsibility for notorious child killer Adrian Lim) to testify for Sek in support of his defence of diminished responsibility. Dr Ellard, who first examined Sek, stated that he was of the opinion that from Sek's lack of remorse for his crimes and his painful childhood and many other factors, Sek was suffering from anti-social personality disorder. Dr. Wong, who examined Sek later, stated that he agreed with Dr. Ellard's report, though he added that he felt that Sek was also suffering from psychopathic personality disorder, with his unhappy childhood as the main contributing factor, and aggravated by Sek's high-intelligence IQ level of 113.

In rebuttal, the prosecution called upon government psychiatrist Dr. Chew Seck Kee, who testified that Sek was not suffering from any mental disorders, as Sek was rational and lucid, able to give a clear account of himself and his crimes, and as he himself said, he had to kill his victims to prevent them from reporting him, which showed that Sek, whom he described as "cold-blooded and cruel", was clearly and fully aware of himself and in full control of his actions. Additionally, Dr. Chew also said that Sek did in fact express some degree of remorse over his actions but also felt that it was too late for regrets. In addition, the prosecution also proved that Sek's claim of being strangled at the boys' homes was not true - Sek had in fact fabricated that story to support his defence of diminished responsibility.

=== Verdict ===
On 14 August 1985, after hearing the closing submissions from the defence and the prosecution, the two judges gave their final verdict, with Justice Lai delivering the judgement. In their written verdict, Justice Lai stated that they both found Sek Kim Wah not of unsound mind at the time of the murders, based on their review of the evidence presented to them. They found that Sek had killed Robert Tay, Annie Low and Jovita Virador with the intention to cause death. Hence, they rejected Sek's defence of diminished responsibility and found him guilty of all the three murders at Andrew Road, and sentenced him to death, ending the 17-day long trial of Sek Kim Wah. Under Singapore law at that time, the crime of murder carried a mandatory sentence of death by long-drop hanging (the standard execution method in Singapore).

Upon hearing that he would be hanged, Sek smiled and thanked the judges in Cantonese, stating that he wanted to die in the gallows, and saying that it would be thrilling. None of Sek's family members were present at the hearing for the sentence.

== Fate of Sek Kim Wah ==
=== Appeal and dismissal ===
Sek Kim Wah filed an appeal against his conviction and sentence. It took more than a year before 22-year-old Sek Kim Wah's appeal was finally brought before the Court of Appeal on 16 March 1987 and heard by three judges - Chief Justice Wee Chong Jin, High Court judge A. P. Rajah and Judicial Commissioner Chan Sek Keong. In the appeal, Sek's lawyer Loh Lin Kok argued that the two judges in Sek's original trial had erred in rejecting Sek's claim of diminished responsibility and the combined evidence of both Dr John Ellard and Dr Wong Yip Chong on Sek's testimony, along with its significance. Mr Loh also brought up the fact mentioned by the two judges that Dr Ellard presented his opinion through "Australian spectacles" when the symptoms displayed by patients of personality disorders are universally relatively similar, a fact which the two judges had erred in finding, Mr Loh said.

Mr Loh further argued in the appeal that the two judges did not state, even on the balance of probabilities, whether they accepted the prosecution's psychiatric expert witness Dr Chew Seck Kee's evidence and findings against those of the two defence psychiatrists. He even pointed out that the judges did not rely much on the evidence of Dr Wong that Sek was also suffering from enuresis, up until the age of 16, which was a symptom of personality disorder (a fact presented by Dr Wong in the original trial).

After hearing the appeal, a day later, on 17 March 1987, the three-judge Court of Appeal released their verdict, read by Chief Justice Wee Chong Jin. The three judges upheld both the conviction and sentence. Chief Justice Wee pointed out that whatever method Dr Ellard used to make his medical findings, it was based on whatever facts that were presented to him; it could be that the doctor had given all the facts he knew of in his testimony but some of them turned out to be untrue. The trial judges, in their original verdict, had rejected the defence's arguments that the findings of the psychiatrists were based on reliable facts. "It was a matter for the trial judges to decide after assessing the facts and medical evidence whether the facts the psychiatrists relied upon were true," said the Chief Justice. He also cited that this was the same reason why the trial judges rejected Dr Wong's testimony as well. The court also told Mr Loh that they could not accept his assertion that Sek was mentally abnormal despite the "great perseverance" in making his arguments. In dismissing the appeal, the final words from the Chief Justice was, "We are not persuaded at all that the trial judges were not entitled to make the finding they did." Sek was reportedly calm throughout the appeal process and the reading of the Court of Appeal's judgement.

=== Execution and funeral ===
On 9 December 1988, more than five years after the Andrew Road murders, as well as the unrelated East Coast Park murders, 24-year-old Sek Kim Wah was hanged on the state gallows of Changi Prison for the five murders. Sek's execution came only two weeks after the hanging of three convicted child murderers (Adrian Lim, Catherine Tan Mui Choo and Hoe Kah Hong) of the notorious 1981 Toa Payoh ritual murders case. The executioner who carried out Sek's hanging was veteran hangman Darshan Singh.

Sek's body was later cremated at Mount Vernon Crematorium. Despite Sek's final wish to have his ashes scattered into the sea, they were stored in an urn in Siong Lim Temple at Toa Payoh, where a simple funeral was held for Sek in accordance to Taoist practices. The funeral was attended by Sek's parents and siblings.

== In popular media ==
=== Re-enactment ===
Approximately 20 years after the Andrew Road case, it was re-enacted on a Singaporean crime show True Files, first broadcast on 2 September 2003.

On 12 March 2022, a five-episode Chinese-language crime series titled Inside Crime Scene re-enacted the two cases of Sek Kim Wah for its first episode. The episode covers the cases, as well as the experts' opinion on the mind of Sek, whom they considered as Singapore's first serial killer in legal history. The case of Anthony Ler, who hired a 15-year-old youth to kill his wife in 2001, was also covered in the same episode.

=== Publication ===
In July 2015, Singapore's national daily newspaper The Straits Times published a e-book titled Guilty As Charged: 25 Crimes That Have Shaken Singapore Since 1965, which included the Andrew Road triple murder case as one of the top 25 crimes that had shocked the nation since its independence in 1965. The book was a collaboration between the Singapore Police Force and the newspaper itself. The paperback edition of the book was published in June 2017 and first entered the ST bestseller list on 8 August 2017, a month after publication.

== See also ==
- Capital punishment in Singapore
- Life imprisonment in Singapore
- Caning in Singapore
- List of serial killers by country
