= Ng Theng Shuang =

Malaysian former fugitive and armed robber hanged in Singapore

- 1993 police mugshot of Ng Theng Shuang
- Born: Ng Theng Shuang; 1 January 1966; Penang, Malaysia
- Died: 14 July 1995 (aged 29); Changi Prison, Singapore
- Cause of death: Execution by hanging
- Occupation: Unemployed
- Spouse: Unnamed wife
- Children: 1 son
- Parent: Unnamed father
- Status: Executed
- Convictions: Illegal discharge of a firearm with intent to cause hurt (two counts); Firearm robbery (one count)
- Criminal charge: 1st, 2nd charge: Illegal discharge of a firearm with intent to cause hurt 3rd charge: Armed robbery of Elizabeth Jeeris
- Penalty: Death penalty (×2; discharge of firearms); Life imprisonment and ten strokes of the cane (armed robbery)

Ng Theng Shuang (黄庭双 Huáng Tíngshuāng; 1 January 1966 – 14 July 1995) was a Penang-born Malaysian and criminal who was one of the two armed robbers involved in a robbery attempt of the Tin Sing Goldsmiths at South Bridge Road in November 1992.

Ng, together with his Malaysian accomplice Lee Kok Chin, later engaged in a shoot-out with Cisco guard Karamjit Singh, whom he injured in the leg. Ng had also shot two other bystanders, a customer and a salesman. Lee was shot in the chest and died, while Ng alone escaped after stealing a woman's station-wagon as his getaway vehicle.

Ng fled to his native state of Penang in Malaysia, where he was arrested a year later on 29 December 1993, and extradited to Singapore, where he was charged under the Arms Offences Act for armed robbery and illegal discharge of a firearm to cause injury. Ng was found guilty and condemned to death in September 1994, and he was hanged on 14 July 1995 after losing his appeal.

== Biography ==
Ng Theng Shuang was born in the Malaysian state of Penang in 1966, and he grew up in Bukit Mertajam.

Ng was a compulsive gambler since young. He often would commit petty crimes whenever he lost money. For almost a year, Ng would gamble in Taiping and spent most of his time at gambling dens with his friends. For an unknown offence, Ng was imprisoned in 1986 before his release in 1988, and he went to work as a coffee shop helper. Later, Ng was also convicted of stealing a car at Kedah in April 1991 and was jailed a second time before his release on bail a month later. Ng was unemployed as of 1993 when he was caught for committing a firearms offence in Singapore.

== South Bridge Road shooting ==
=== Armed robbery and shoot-out ===
The shootout resulted in the death of Ng's accomplice Lee Kok Chin, who sustained a fatal gunshot wound on his chest

On 19 November 1992, both 26-year-old Ng Theng Shuang and his 27-year-old accomplice Lee Kok Chin (李国成 Lǐ Guóchéng), who was also a Malaysian, armed themselves with guns and grenades and went to commit robbery at Singapore's South Bridge Road, after they allegedly entered Singapore illegally by boat.

Targeting the Tin Sing Goldsmiths, both Lee and Ng wore crash helmets with visors and together, they forcibly entered the shop with their guns, threatening the 30 employees and eight customers inside the shop at gunpoint. One of them was a Cisco officer named Karamjit Singh, who was 22 years old and only joined the force a year ago. Despite being warned by the robbers to not shoot or he would get shot, Singh reached for his service revolver. It resulted in one of the robbers, Ng Theng Shuang, who was armed with a 9mm Luger semi-automatic pistol, to fire his gun at Singh, injuring the officer's right thigh. Afterwards, Singh took cover behind a counter and asked the other hostages to also take cover and hide. A gunfight therefore ensued between Singh and the two robbers, who all exchanged gunshots on both sides. During the gunfight, Singh managed to shoot one of the robbers, Lee Kok Chin, in the chest. Two other people, a 57-year-old salesman named Ou Kai San and a 39-year-old female customer Rosie Kee Lye Choon, were also injured during the exchange of gunfire.

The two robbers decided to make an escape after they shoot six times. They stole a motorcycle and rode it off together, with Ng sitting in the front while Lee was at the back. Singh tried to give chase, but Ng fired another shot and injured Singh on the right ankle. Singh therefore gave up and instead went back to the shop to contact the police. Shortly after getting onto the motorcycle, Lee fell off and collapsed on the street, having died due to the gunshot wound on his chest.

After Lee fell off the motorcycle, Ng went on to rob a woman named Elizabeth Jeeris of her station-wagon and used it as a getaway vehicle to drive away. After managing to escape and later abandon the stolen car, Ng then ran off to Malaysia. The three injured victims, including Singh, survived their injuries.

=== Death of Lee Kok Chin ===
Lee Kok Chin, Ng's accomplice who was shot dead

While Ng managed to escape, his accomplice Lee Kok Chin, who was mortally wounded in the chest, was pronounced dead at the spot where he had fallen from the motorcycle. The police, who managed to identify Lee through his fingerprints, also found a semi-automatic pistol, a Llama .38, and two live grenades in his possession. These weapons were confirmed to have been smuggled into Singapore.

It was revealed that in the past, Lee had committed vehicle and snatch thefts in Singapore and was jailed in 1987, before he was released in 1989. In fact, Lee was also placed on the wanted list by the Royal Malaysia Police for several armed robberies committed in Penang, including a bank robbery in Bukit Mertajam and holding a businessman hostage and injuring the victim during a robbery at Butterworth. In the most recent offence he committed in Singapore before the current case, Lee also used a gun to rob a moneychanger and his brother at gunpoint at Golden Note Trading on North Bridge Road. In this case, Lee had allegedly fired his gun and killed the 34-year-old moneychanger Ng Teck Kwang, and even injured the victim's 32-year-old brother Ng Kiang Kwang.

At the press conference conducted after the shootout, Police Commissioner Tee Tua Ba defended the actions of Singh, who was criticized by some people for endangering the lives of the civilians during the shootout. Commissioner Tee stated that during situations where a civilian's or officer's life was threatened by the imminent risk of death, the officers are bound to have the right to act in self-defense and act accordingly to protect innocent lives as far as possible. He commented that for their defiance against the members of law enforcement, the robbers deserved death. Singh was awarded with a commendation certificate, a plate from the Certis Cisco and even received a double promotion from constable to corporal for his heroic actions and professional discharge of his duties during the incident.

In October 1993, nearly a year after the shooting incident, a coroner's court ruled that Lee Kok Chin's death was one of a justifiable homicide, as the officer Karamjit Singh had rightly exercised his right to self-defense in the face of the robbers being armed and the customers, employees and himself at the goldsmith shop were at risk of being injured or killed in this situation. The bullet that caused hurt to customer Rosie Kee was certified to be coming from Lee's pistol.

=== Ng's escape to Malaysia and arrest ===
Ng Theng Shuang managed to flee to Malaysia after committing the crime. Ng went into hiding at his hometown in Penang for about a year before the Royal Malaysia Police finally traced his whereabouts and arrested 27-year-old Ng Theng Shuang at Bukit Mertajam on 29 December 1993. Ng was extradited back to Singapore, where he was charged on 31 December 1993 with discharging a firearm to cause hurt to Karamjit Singh and the two bystanders. Under the Arms Offences Act, a conviction for such an offence warrant the mandatory imposition of capital punishment in Singapore. A week later, Ng faced two fresh charges, including one of committing a firearm robbery at the goldsmith shop.

== Trial and sentencing ==
=== High Court hearing ===
On 22 August 1994, the trial of Ng Theng Shuang began at the High Court, with S. Rajendran assigned as the trial judge. Ng was represented by Simon Tan and P. Suppiah, and the case itself was prosecuted by both Chan Seng Onn and Muhammad Hidhir Majid. Three charges - one of firearms robbery and two of discharging a firearm to cause hurt - were proceeded against Ng.

The prosecution called on Lee's girlfriend Ng Swee Cheng and Han How Eng as their key witnesses, who both testified against Ng. Lee's girlfriend, a Singaporean, told the court that on the evening of the crime, Ng telephoned her to inform her about her boyfriend's death and the crime they committed. Ng even told Lee's girlfriend to pass the news of Lee's death to Lee's brother. Han also testified that Ng went to Singapore during that same month to live in his house and he left Malaysia after the occurrence of the shootout. Fingerprint tests were also conducted, and Ng's fingerprints matched to those found on the stolen station-wagon, the same one used by Ng to escape during the shoot-out. Karamjit Singh himself also came to court to testify against Ng. The filmed scenes of the shootout was taken from a CCTV camera and also presented to the court as evidence.

Although he initially confessed to the crime during police interrogation, Ng however argued in court that he was not in Singapore at the time of the alleged offences. He admitted that Lee Kok Chin was his close friend and had met him in Penang, but when the offences happened on the day in question, Ng himself was in a gambling den in Perak's Taiping, and stated it could be someone else who went into Singapore with Lee to rob the goldsmith. Ng stated that the Malaysian passport he used to enter Singapore was in fact, the same one he reported missing in Thailand during a trip there a few years ago, and it was possible that someone may have used his lost passport to enter Singapore to commit the crimes he was accused of committing.

The prosecution rebutted Ng's alibi defence, citing the fact that Ng had already confessed earlier in his police statements and the evidence of his fingerprints and other witnesses clearly showed that Ng was indeed present at the scene of crime when the shootout happened, and they sought from the court a rejection of Ng's defence and a guilty verdict in Ng's case. Subsequently, the verdict was scheduled to be given on 15 September 1994.

=== Verdict ===
On 15 September 1994, Justice Rajendran issued his verdict, in which he stated he rejected Ng's defence of an alibi, accepting the testimonies of Lee's girlfriend and Ng's friend that Ng was indeed in Singapore robbing the goldsmith shop, engaging in the shoot-out, and having shot Cisco officer Karamjit Singh. The judge also found that the fingerprint tests had effectively implicated Ng for his involvement of the crime, for which the prosecution had proven its case beyond a reasonable doubt.

As such, 28-year-old Ng Theng Shuang was found guilty of two counts of illegally discharging a firearm to cause hurt under the Arms Offences Act, and he received two death sentences for each of these two charges. Ng was also convicted of the third charge of committing a firearm robbery and sentenced to life imprisonment with ten strokes of the cane, but as long as his death sentences were not commuted and still in effect, Ng was not allowed to serve both his life sentence and caning. Ng was the first person to be convicted under the amended version of the Arms Offences Act, under which it included a new section, which dictates that a person's use of a firearm carried the legal presumption of having an intention to cause harm. Another first case was that of Lim Chwee Soon (alias Ah Soon), who robbed a goldsmith shop in 1995 and used a Colt .45 to commit the robbery and shoot the shop manager. Lim himself was found guilty in July 1996, and was hanged on 25 July 1997.

Reportedly, Ng Theng Shuang smiled at the sentence, and his father, who was present in the courtroom, was devastated at the verdict, and Ng told him it would be alright as he was escorted out of the courtroom.

=== Responses ===
During the time he was pending trial and later incarceration on death row, Ng's father would often visit his son regularly in prison, and during that time, Ng's wife never visited him. In fact, on the day Ng was caught, it was also the date of Ng's marriage with an unnamed woman. The sudden arrest of Ng during the wedding dinner caused much humiliation to Ng's wife, who was shocked at the sight of her husband's arrest. As a result, Ng's wife was shunned by most of her friends, and she never went outdoors for a period of time since the arrest was widely-known inside the small town of Bukit Mertajam. Ng's wife blamed her husband for having caused her much hardship and embarrassment. Ng's wife was two months' pregnant at the time, and she gave birth to a son in July 1994. Ng only saw his son, then two months old, for the first time during his first week of solitary confinement on death row.

A month after the trial of Ng, the Singapore Police Force told the press that due to the close cooperation between the two countries' respective authorities, the successful prosecution of Ng for his crime was made possible and therefore, Commissioner Tee Tua Ba thanked the Malaysian police for the contribution to Ng's arrest.

== Execution ==
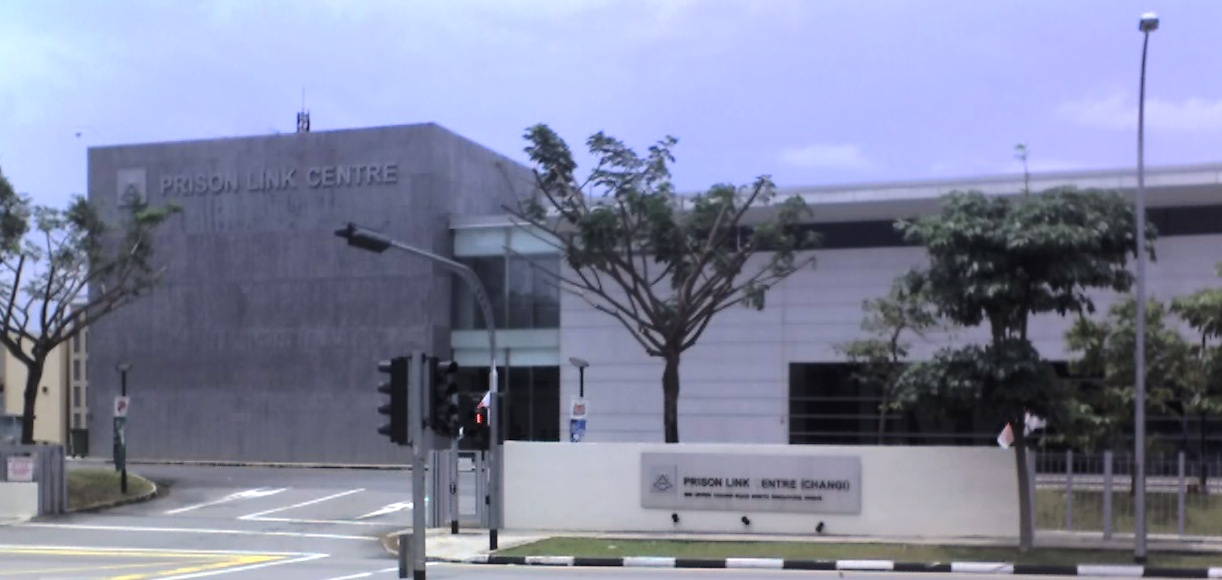
Changi Prison, where Ng was hanged in 1995 for his role in the shoot-out.

After the end of his trial, Ng Theng Shuang appealed his death sentence and conviction. He engaged veteran Malaysian lawyer Karpal Singh to represent him in his appeal, in which he once again argued through his new lawyer that he was not in Singapore at the time of the offence and sought to overturn the trial verdict. However, the appeal was dismissed by the Court of Appeal on 26 January 1995. Ng's clemency petition was rejected by then President of Singapore Ong Teng Cheong on 1 July 1995.

On the Friday morning of 14 July 1995, 13 days after the loss of his clemency plea, 29-year-old Ng Theng Shuang was hanged at Changi Prison.

== Aftermath ==
In the aftermath, Singaporean crime show Crimewatch re-enacted the South Bridge Road shooting case, and it first aired in March 1996 as the first episode of its annual season.

In December 1997, two years after Ng was put to death, a coroner's inquiry heard the case of Ng Teck Kwang's death, and it issued a verdict of murder, finding Ng Theng Shuang's accomplice Lee Kok Chin responsible for the murder of the moneychanger back in October 1992. When he was arrested and brought back to Singapore, Ng Theng Shuang also confirmed to the police that Lee was indeed involved in the armed robbery that resulted in the death of Ng Teck Kwang, as well as the victim's brother being injured. Since Lee was already dead and could not be tried for the robbery and murder, the coroner's verdict was listed as one of "murder by an unknown person".

The Cisco officer Karamjit Singh returned to his job after a six-month medical leave. He received recommendations for his heroic deeds during the shooting incident. When he was interviewed in November 2014, 22 years after the shoot-out, Singh, then 44 years old, was reportedly married with two teenage daughters and was since promoted to Sergeant, and still remained working in the Certis Cisco. Singh stated that he left the incident behind him and moved on, but he remained modest about his deed, and still kept newspaper clippings about the case, which he planned to show to his grandchildren in the future.

== See also ==
- Arms Offences Act
- Caning in Singapore
- Life imprisonment in Singapore
- Capital punishment in Singapore
