= Lim Ban Lim =

Singaporean outlaw

- Born: c. 1940; Paya Lebar, Singapore
- Died: 24 November 1972 (aged 32); Queenstown, Singapore
- Cause of death: Gunshot wounds
- Other names: Tua Hong Li; Tau Hong Lim; Seow Lim; Ah Seow; Suay Kia; Oei Kia; Ah Oei; Jipun Kia; Botak
- Occupation: Gangster
- Known for: One of Singapore's most wanted fugitives in the 1960s
- Spouse: "Madam Yeo" (m. 1956)
- Children: 5
- Allegiance: 18SioYiHo(小义和）

Lim Ban Lim (simplified Chinese: 林万霖; traditional Chinese: 林萬霖; pinyin: Lín Wànlín; Pe̍h-ōe-jī: Lîm Bān-lîm; c. 1940 – 24 November 1972) was a Singaporean gangster and outlaw who killed a police officer and stole at least $2.5 million before he was shot and killed at the age of 32. Lim became one of the country's most wanted fugitives after shooting and wounding a police officer during an altercation in May 1965. After shooting dead another police officer in July 1968, Lim fled the country, with local authorities offering a $17,000 bounty in their search for him. He evaded capture until 1972, when he returned to Singapore and was killed by the Singapore Police Force.

== Early life ==
Lim was born and raised in Lorong Tai Seng (大成巷) in Paya Lebar, Singapore. The third of twelve children, he was a son of a fisherman. He attended Fengshan Primary School but did not complete his primary education. Before embarking on a criminal career, Lim was at different times a hawker, construction worker, and handyman.

== Criminal career ==
Lim was a member of the Gi Ho secret society who was involved in several misdemeanors from as early as 1958. He was reportedly trained as a shooter in the Riau Islands. He first attained notoriety in 1963, when he and three other gunmen ambushed the printing division of The Straits Times at Anson Road and stole $30,000 in an armed robbery. The same year, he stole $11,000 from the Singapore Steam Laundry. In 1966, Lim robbed the First National City Bank in Collyer Quay of $156,000, marking his most lucrative robbery in Singapore. In August 1968, together with five accomplices, Lim robbed the State Treasury in Johor, Malaysia of $452,000, killing a constable in the process. On 4 October 1972, Lim was involved in the robbery of the Atlas Electronics factory in Lower Delta Road and made away with $62,000. In his nine-year reign as a robber active in both Singapore and Malaysia, Lim amassed a fortune of at least $2.5 million.

In May 1965, Lim became one of Singapore's most wanted fugitives after an altercation with Detective Peter Lim in Paya Lebar; the police officer had accosted Lim, who then snatched away his revolver, which fired and wounded Peter Lim. Lim later mailed the revolver to a newspaper editor, appending a letter which stated, "As a measure of self defence, I took the revolver and ran away. I could have shot at the detective while he was down but what for?" In September 1966, he shot and wounded in the leg Detective Allan Lee at the Odeon Cinema in North Bridge Road. A $2,000 bounty was announced by authorities in October 1966.

On 23 June 1968, Lim shot and killed 27-year-old Corporal Koh Chong Thye with a semi-automatic pistol; Koh and two other police officers had been in pursuit of Lim after he was spotted in Serangoon. Koh, who was married with two children when he died, suffered gunshots to the chest and face and a fatal one through the forehead. The two other officers gave chase but Lim escaped and went into hiding, reportedly finding safe haven in the nearby countries of Indonesia, Thailand, and China. A nation-wide manhunt was announced by the Singapore Police Force, whose Criminal Investigation Department began organising more raids in the hopes of capturing Lim. An initial reward of $5,000 was also offered. The bounty was raised to $10,000 in March 1969 and a record $17,000 by November 1972.

== Personal life ==
Reportedly 1.65 metres (5 ft 5 in) tall and of Hokkien descent, Lim was an ambidextrous shooter. To disguise himself, he reportedly cross-dressed and underwent plastic surgery. He went by many aliases, including Tua Hong Li, Tau Hong Lim, (Note: Hokkien for "Crazy Lim". Also "Thau Hong Lim".) Seow Lim, Ah Seow, Suay Kia, Oei Kia, Ah Oei, Jipun Kia, (Note: Also "Jepun Kia".) and Botak. He married his childhood sweetheart, a "Madam Yeo", in 1956 when he was aged 16. They had three daughters and two sons. After his death in 1972, Lim's family claimed that they had not seen him in some seven years. In December 1977, Lim's brother Ah Tee (born c. 1952) sustained serious injuries after being stabbed in the thigh and head by a mob of ten youths. Four of his friends were injured too. Another of Lim's siblings, Ah Lek, speculated that Ah Tee was attacked for his affiliation with Lim.

On 30 August 1996, Lim's cousin Teo Kim Hong was hanged for murder. In May 2007, Teo's brother Teo Cheow Kim was sentenced to death for trafficking 30.37g of heroin. Lim Ah Tee had also been charged with drug trafficking in the same case as Teo but avoided the death penalty after the prosecution granted him a discharge not amounting to an acquittal.

== Death ==
Lim had previously boasted to the police over the telephone: "You will never catch me. When you are about to arrest me, I will surely engage you in a gunfight. I will use the last bullet to end my life, so you can only collect my body." In November 1972, Lim returned to Singapore with his right-hand man Chua Ah Kow. (Note: Also "Chua Ah Kau".) At the time, he was the most wanted fugitive in Singapore. On 24 November, Lim and Chua visited the pasar malam at Margaret Drive in Queenstown. Officers from the Rural West Division of the Singapore Police Force already had intelligence on their whereabouts. At about 8:15 pm local time, they were spotted by a team of six police officers lying in wait. The team was led by Deputy Superintendent Henry Edwards of Bukit Panjang Police Station. Lim attempted to escape by separating from Chua but was shot and killed by the police. Lim suffered three gunshots to the body and reportedly staggered for some 10 metres (33 ft) before dying with his revolver on his left hand. He was aged 32.

Although authorities were initially uncertain if the deceased was Lim, as he had changed his hairstyle and put on weight, he was positively identified by his fingerprints. A revolver, thirteen bullets, $1.40 in cash, as well as a stolen identity card belonging to a 30-year-old Lim Kian Hua, were among his possessions found on him when he died. An unnamed police officer was also killed during the shootout. Detective Chow Kim Loo was later publicly identified as the officer who fired the fatal shot that hit Lim in the neck. Chua managed to evade capture that night but committed suicide during a shootout with the police three weeks later at Tank Road on 17 December 1972.

== Aftermath ==
On 25 November 1972, 33 inmates escaped from the Ulu Bedok Reformative Training Centre. They had reportedly escaped to attend Lim's funeral, although the recaptured inmates later denied this by claiming that they were simply unsatisfied with the living conditions in the centre. Lim was buried on 28 November 1972 at Choa Chu Kang Cemetery. Following Lim's death, the Arms Offences Act was enacted in 1973, making the use or attempted use of firearms to cause harm punishable by death. Lim was reportedly the first criminal in Singapore to have evaded justice by undergoing plastic surgery; a second case was reported in November 1981.

Singaporean serial killer Sek Kim Wah, who was charged with killing three victims during an armed robbery at Andrew Road and two more at Seletar Road in 1983, had once mentioned to a witness in his trial that he wanted to be better than Lim Ban Lim. Sek was indicted for all five murders but was only convicted of the triple killings at Andrew Road and given the death sentence in August 1985. After losing his appeal against his sentence in March 1987, Sek was hanged at dawn in Changi Prison on 9 December 1988.
