= Khor Kok Soon =

Singaporean gunman and suspected killer

- Khor Kok Soon, pictured in 1984
- Born: Khor Kok Soon; 23 February 1953; Singapore
- Died: c. 2006 (aged 52 or 53); Changi Prison, Singapore
- Cause of death: Execution by hanging
- Other name: Ah Soon
- Occupation: Odd-job labourer
- Spouse: Unnamed wife
- Children: Two daughters
- Status: Executed
- Conviction: Illegal discharge of a firearm with intent to cause hurt (three counts)
- Criminal charges: 1st charge: Murder (withdrawn); 2nd, 3rd and 4th charges: Illegal discharge of a firearm with intent to cause hurt
- Penalty: Death penalty (×3)

Khor Kok Soon (许国顺 Xŭ Guóshùn; 23 February 1953 – c. 2006) was a Singaporean gunman who was notorious for his high-profile shoot-out with the police at Shenton Way on 30 July 1984 and was also the prime suspect behind the murder of a 26-year-old lorry driver, whom he held as a hostage to help him drive away from the police before he allegedly killed him. Khor, who was involved in previous armed robbery offences prior to the 1984 shooting incident, fled Singapore after the gunfight and went on the run for the next 19 years, therefore becoming one of Singapore's ten most wanted criminals.

Khor was arrested at Malaysia's Johor Bahru in December 2003, and he was extradited to Singapore to be charged with murder under the Penal Code, and also faced another three charges of illegally discharging a firearm under the Arms Offences Act. Subsequently, Khor was given a discharge not amounting to an acquittal for the lorry driver's murder, but he was convicted of firing his gun with intent to cause hurt, and sentenced to death on 25 February 2005. After losing his appeal in September 2005, Khor was eventually hanged at Changi Prison in 2006.

== Biography ==
Khor Kok Soon was born in Singapore on 23 February 1953 and grew up with many siblings. He only studied up to Primary Six in elementary school, and he left school to become independent. It was at this point that he gradually went astray, and he was first caught committing theft at age 13. He also became addicted to gambling, and often suffered great losses.

In 1979, Khor was arrested for robbery, but the charge was reduced to theft and Khor spent a few months in prison before his release that same year. Shortly after his release, Khor formed a gang with three other people, in which all four of them would commit armed robbery, and they were involved in nearly 15 cases. Out of these robberies, Khor was involved in the October 1983 robbery of a lead factory owner in which he fired three shots at the victim, who survived the injuries. Another case took place on 30 March 1984 at Empress Place, where Khor robbed a pregnant woman and got off with S$9,000, and a third at Enggor Street on 19 May 1984, where Khor robbed a pair of sisters at gunpoint and got off with S$36,000 in loot.

In his personal life, Khor was married with two daughters, who were born in 1974 and 1978. He also worked odd jobs and even sold ang ku kueh to make a living aside from his criminal career.

== Shenton Way shooting incident ==
=== Shoot-out with police ===
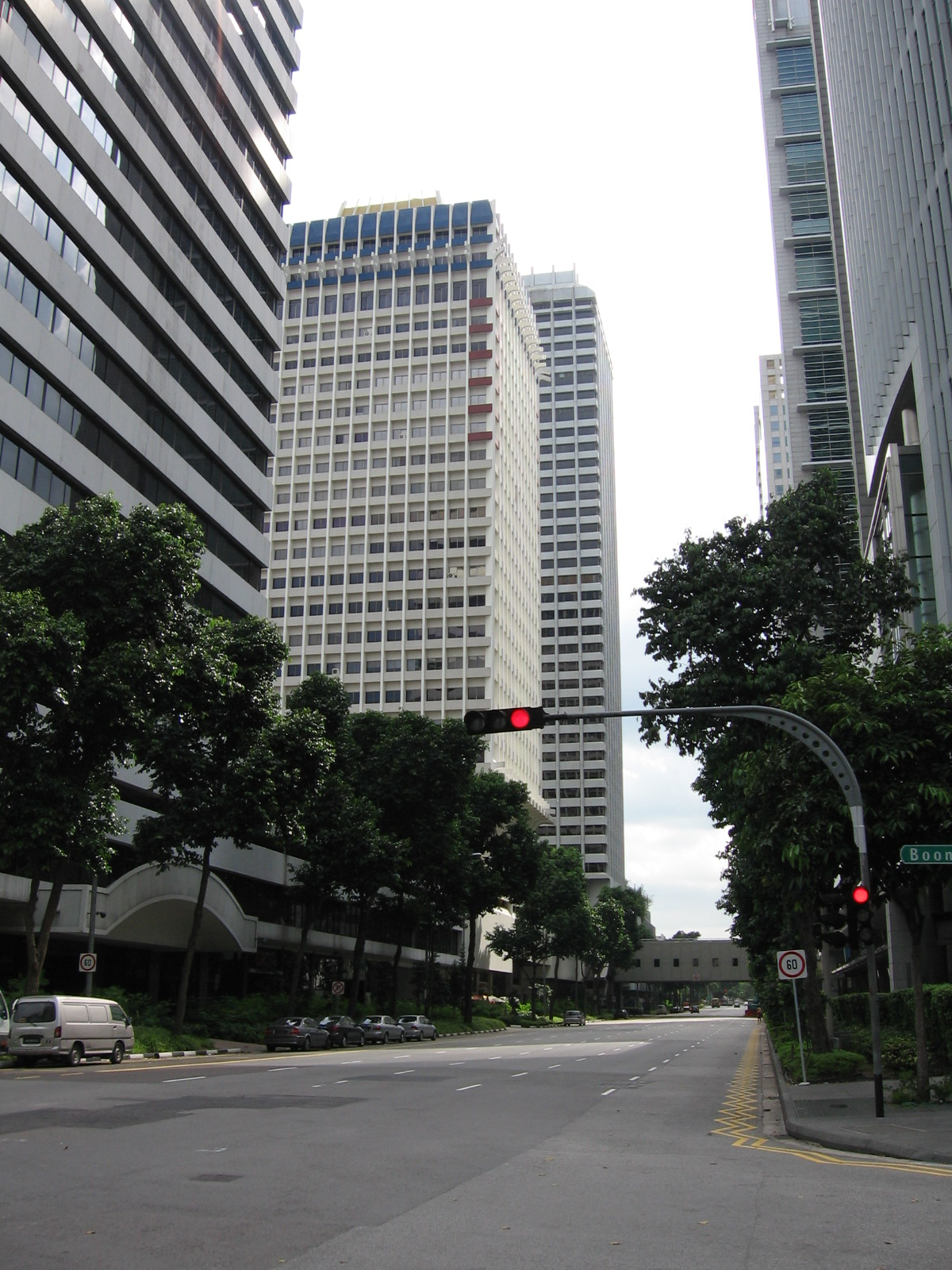
Shenton Way, pictured in 2006, where the shooting incident took place within its perimeter.

On the afternoon of 30 July 1984, 31-year-old Khor Kok Soon and his 43-year-old accomplice Lim Woo Sung (林武生 Lín Wǔshēng), alias "Toh Huay Seow", planned to commit armed robbery at Shenton Way. Riding a stolen motorcycle, both Khor and Lim headed to Shenton Way, and upon reaching the place, they roamed the area and monitored at least six banks, looking for a target to rob. The pair's intention was not to rob a bank, but to rob any people who carried huge amounts of cash to the bank.

By the time the pair went to the sixth bank, a team of police officers were already arriving due to a tip-off about the presence of armed robbers at Shenton Way. When Khor went inside the bank to search for targets to rob, Lim was approached by police and he was arrested. As for Khor, he was followed by two police detectives, Corporal Quek Chek Kwang (郭志光 Guō Zhìguāng) and Sergeant Lim Kiah Chin (林家振 Lín Jiāzhèn). After stalking Khor for some distance on the streets, both Sergeant Lim and Corporal Quek proceeded to restrain Khor, who brandished his gun, a .22 Browning Hi-Power, and pointed it at the two officers after breaking free of their grip. Afterwards, Khor made his escape.

While the two policemen gave chase after Khor, Khor ran onto the road and he attempted to climb onto a passing lorry, threatening the driver at gunpoint to drive him to safety. While Khor tried to enter the lorry, he first discharged his gun at one of the two officers, Sergeant Lim, who was the nearest behind him. The shot missed Sergeant Lim, and several shots were exchanged between Khor and the two officers, who were joined by a third policeman, Senior Inspector (SI) Cyril Sta Maria, who was not involved in the operation to capture Khor but happened to be driving by while off-duty. After the shoot-out, Khor managed to get into the lorry, and it drove off despite the police giving chase.

=== Murder of Ong King Hock ===
Ong King Hock, the lorry driver who was held hostage by Khor before he was found dead.

Later that day, the lorry which was boarded by Khor was found abandoned in a back alley at Teo Hong Road, and inside the lorry, the 26-year-old lorry driver Ong King Hock (王庆福 Wáng Qìngfú) was found dead with a gaping gunshot wound on the right side of his neck, with his body leaning against the steering wheel. At the time of his death, Ong, the fifth of seven children, left behind a fiancée, his parents, two older brother, two elder sisters and two younger sisters, and he worked for his brother, a contractor, as a lorry driver. On that fateful day, Ong was driving that lorry along Shenton Way after having lunch with his brother, with the intention of heading to the police station to pay a traffic fine on his brother's behalf, when Khor entered his lorry and forced him to drive him before he was killed, allegedly by Khor or any of the pursuing police officers. A search in the area also led to the discovery of Khor's bloodstained shirt, which implied that Khor was injured on the back shoulder. However, Khor was nowhere to be found.

According to Professor Chao Tzee Cheng, the senior forensic pathologist who performed an autopsy on Ong's corpse, the cause of death was due to the bullet penetrating the neck and severing the spinal column, which killed Ong within minutes. Also, it was opined that Khor was most likely the one who killed Ong, as the bullet that killed Ong did not belong to any of the policemen's revolvers, because the bullets issued to police were of .38 calibre and the test firing of the police's guns showed none of the bullets matched to those of the bullet, which was measured to be much larger than .22 calibre. Based on the degree of damage caused and little amount of blood around Ong's driver seat, the shot that killed Ong was fired point blank from a close-range distance of 10 to 12 cm, and the killing may have taken place at the back alley of Teo Hong Road or somewhere in the nearby streets.

In a coroner's inquiry that took place in December 1998, 14 years after Ong was killed, State Coroner Shaifuddin Saruwan issued a guilty verdict of murder, which effectively found Khor guilty of murdering the lorry driver, though it did not amount to a conviction. By then, Ong's family was still paying attention to the case's developments, and Ong's ex-fiancée had re-married in 1988 and become a mother, but like Ong's bereaved kin, she still regularly sought updates on the development of her former fiancé's case and hoped for justice to be served.

=== Wanted list ===
As a result of the shoot-out, as well as the murder of the lorry driver Ong King Hock, 31-year-old Khor Kok Soon was immediately placed on top of the police's wanted list, with preliminary charges of murder and firearm offences tendered against him. They also informed the public through the media to be alert of the "armed and dangerous" murder suspect. The police also sought the assistance and cooperation of the local police from both Malaysia and Thailand to trace Khor's whereabouts, as he was believed to have escaped to either Malaysia or Thailand. The remaining members of Khor's gang were also arrested and dealt with under the law, and Khor's accomplice Lim Woo Sung, who was caught on the day of the shoot-out, was placed under detention. He died at the age of 55 on 17 August 1996 while in prison.

In 1987, Singaporean crime show Crimewatch re-enacted the Shenton Way shoot-out, with the police sending out a public appeal for members of the public to provide any information relating to Khor's whereabouts.

Khor remained one of the ten most wanted criminals on the wanted list for 19 years before his arrest, with the wanted list being regularly updated over the years in 1987, 1988, 1991, 1993, 1996, 1998 and 2000 before his capture in Malaysia. In 1988, Khor surpassed wanted cop-killer Lim Keng Peng (alias Ah Huat), who shot detective Goh Ah Kia in 1985 before he was gunned down in 1988, as the No. 1 wanted criminal on the list.

== Life on the run ==
After he managed to escape from the police, Khor Kok Soon spent his first days in hiding in Singapore. He managed to leave Singapore with the help of a local ganglord and went to Malaysia with the S$20,000 he reaped from his previous robberies. Before Khor left Singapore, he sent handwritten letters to the press, telling the reporters that he was indeed involved in the shooting, but he protested his innocence and said he was not the one who killed Ong King Hock, the lorry driver he held hostage. The handwriting on the letters were confirmed by Khor's wife to be her husband's.

After reaching Malaysia, where he would live in hiding for the next 19 years, Khor went to Johor Bahru to meet a friend, whom he asked for help to escape to Thailand, but the friend did not have anyone to contact in Thailand. On the friend's recommendation, Khor travelled to Kelantan to meet another acquaintance, with whom he stayed for months before returning to Johor Bahru, where he lived for three to four years while seeking refuge from a childhood friend, who recommended he work as an odd-job labourer.

After this, Khor would travel to and live for a few months in Kedah and Penang respectively, before he settled in Kuala Lumpur, where he lived until 1993, and moved back to Johor Bahru. Khor also incurred huge debts from gambling during his time hiding in Malaysia, making him often have to move between places to hide from his debtors. Khor also worked in various jobs (illegally) to sustain his living, including as a courier and odd-job worker. In August 2003, four months before he was caught, Khor suffered a stroke but he was still able to move normally.

== Arrest and trial ==
=== Capture and indictment ===
The police mugshot of Khor Kok Soon, taken in 2003 after his extradition to Singapore

On 23 December 2003, after 19 years on the run, 50-year-old Khor Kok Soon was finally arrested in the Malaysian state of Johor by the Royal Malaysia Police. Three days later, Khor was extradited to Singapore to face trial. After he arrived back in Singapore, Khor was charged with one count of murder under the Penal Code for killing 26-year-old Ong King Hock, and another three counts of illegally discharging a firearm under the Arms Offences Act, in relation to him firing his gun at Sergeant Lim Kiah Chin.

=== Trial ===
On 14 February 2005, after twenty years and seven months of evading justice, 51-year-old Khor Kok Soon was finally brought to trial for three charges of unlawfully discharging a firearm with intent to cause hurt. Khor did not stand trial for the murder of Ong King Hock, as the prosecution withdrew the murder charge against Khor in September 2004 and Khor received a discharge not amounting to an acquittal. It was reported that Khor, who denied murdering the lorry driver, was unhappy about the discharge and insisted to be tried for murder to prove he was innocent of Ong's murder. In his trial, Khor was represented by both Edmond Pereira and Chia Boon Teck, while Liew Thiam Leng was the trial prosecutor, and Kan Ting Chiu was appointed as the trial judge to preside over the hearing.

The two retired policemen, SI Cyril Sta Maria and the victim, Sergeant Lim Kiah Chin, came to court to testify for the prosecution. However, Corporal Quek Chek Kwang did not come to court as a witness, as he suffered a stroke to the right side of his body in January 1993, and a neurologist determined that based on his condition, Corporal Quek was unfit to come to court to testify and would not be able to cope with the stress of undergoing cross-examination in court. The investigating officer Raj Kumar and forensic pathologist Chao Tzee Cheng also died prior to Khor's arrest and trial. Therefore, the prosecution depended on the evidence of both Sergeant Lim and SI Sta Maria to prosecute Khor.

Sergeant Lim, who was 43 years old at the time of the incident, was the first witness to testify. He stated that on 30 July 1984, Khor aimed his gun at him and fired the first shot while he was giving chase after Khor. Sergeant Lim, who was unharmed at that time, said that Khor climbed onto the back of Ong's lorry, and fired a second time at Sergeant Lim when the policeman returned fire once and tried to climb onto the lorry after him. According to Sergeant Lim, Khor moved closer to aim at him again, firing the gun a third time. Sergeant Lim, who was able to evade both the second and third shot, said he returned fire again twice but they missed, and Khor climbed to the front of the lorry from the right side, forcing Ong at gunpoint to drive him away.

SI Sta Maria, the second prosecution witness, stated he was off-duty and driving along Shenton Way to the hospital when he encountered Khor fleeing the pursuit of Corporal Quek and Sergeant Lim. SI Sta Maria testified that Khor fired his gun twice, and he was pointing his gun towards Sergeant Lim both times. SI Sta Maria also said that Corporal Quek returned fire once after Sergeant Lim made two missed shots at Khor, and by the time SI Sta Maria grabbed his service revolver, the lorry was speeding off and he had to give chase after the lorry. In the course, he picked up Corporal Quek to go after Ong's lorry together.

When Khor went to the stand to give his defence, Khor admitted he indeed fired his gun but denied that he aimed the gun at Sergeant Lim. Instead, he claimed that he fired his gun while aiming upwards into the air at all times. Khor testified that in contrast to the police's claims, it was not the physically slim Sergeant Lim but a chubby-faced, big-sized policeman, identified as Corporal Quek, who grabbed him from behind, and he fired the first shot in the air to warn the officers from getting near him, and he subsequently fired more shots in the air while getting on the lorry. On the stand, Khor additionally stated he did not kill the lorry driver, given that he was sitting on the left side and the bullet that killed Ong came from the right. He said that he got shot on the shoulder during the escape, and at the same time, he witnessed the lorry driver's limp body collapsing on the steering wheel, and he, therefore, took over the wheel to drive all the way to the small alley, where he abandoned the lorry and Ong's corpse He then went into hiding, marking the start of his 19-year life as a fugitive wanted for murder.

=== Verdict ===
On 25 February 2005, two days after Khor celebrated his 52nd birthday, the trial verdict was scheduled to be given in court by Justice Kan Ting Chiu.

In his judgement, Justice Kan commented that the trial itself was unusual in nature, given that the case took place more than twenty years before the trial and that out of the witnesses, the investigation officer Inspector Raj Kumar died years ago, Corporal Quek could not give his testimony due to poor health, and even the two retired policemen, Sergeant Lim and SI Sta Maria, as well as the defendant Khor Kok Soon himself, were unable to accurately recall the sequence of events as a result of the quick turn of events that day and the two decades that had passed since the incident. Still, Justice Kan found that based on the totality of evidence, Khor had indeed intentionally aimed his gun at Sergeant Lim and fired the shots thrice in Sergeant Lim's direction with intent to cause hurt and that it was Sergeant Lim who grabbed Khor instead of Corporal Quek prior to the shootout. Justice Kan also rejected the inconsistent evidence of Khor with regard to where he aimed the gun, and he also concluded that Khor had the intention to cause harm to Sergeant Lim when firing the gun. He also noted that the gun and bullets linking Khor to the crime were never recovered, but he found that this had no bearing on his judgement to find Khor guilty since the elements of the charge were proven beyond a reasonable doubt due to the undisputed finding that Khor indeed fired a loaded gun at Sergeant Lim in order to cause him harm.

In the end, Justice Kan found 52-year-old Khor Kok Soon guilty of illegally discharging his firearm with intent to cause harm under the Arms Offences Act, and consequently, Khor was sentenced to death. Reportedly, Khor became emotional about the verdict, and he requested the judge to allow him to undergo a second trial or be fully discharged with an acquittal for the murder of 26-year-old lorry driver Ong King Hock, as he wanted to be given a chance to prove his innocence over the lorry driver's death. The prosecution did not give any reason behind the discharge despite the judge's inquiry and his agreement with Khor's reason for wanting to be tried for Ong's murder.

=== Reactions to verdict ===
The families of both Khor Kok Soon and the murdered lorry driver Ong King Hock were present in court to hear the verdict.

Khor's 30-year-old elder daughter, whose name was not known, was devastated at the verdict. She stated that after her father went into hiding in 1984, their relatives distanced themselves from her family, leaving her mother to painstakingly raise both her and her younger sister alone, and had to fork out savings with their aunt's help to open a shop to make a living. She was able to send her elder daughter to university and younger daughter to a polytechnic. Khor's elder daughter stated that she and her sister had to go through lonely childhoods due to their fear that their friends and classmates would found out the identity of their father, who was an infamous fugitive accused of murder. She added that she long forgave her father when she went to visit him in prison on the date of Khor's birthday in February 2004 after his arrest, and expressed that her father, who regretted the death of Ong, always hoped to be tried for Ong's murder to prove his innocence regarding the case and would not rest in peace if he could not do so. Khor was also deeply remorseful of having failed as a father and being absent from his children's life for those years he spent in hiding.

As for Ong King Hock's 53-year-old older brother Ong Siow Meng (王小铭 Wáng Xiǎomíng), he was saddened and confused over the fact that the truth and real identity of the killer behind his brother's death did not come to light. He stated that after Ong died on 30 July 1984, his parents, himself and his four sisters were struggling with extreme sadness over the unfortunate event. To make matters worse, the death of Ong took a toll on his parents' health, and they died within a year after Ong was murdered, which further brought the surviving siblings of Ong emotional desolation, but they still held on to hope that Khor could be arrested. Ong's brother said that when he heard in 1998 that the coroner court judged Khor guilty of his brother's murder, he felt relieved about knowing who killed his brother, but he was despondent over Khor remaining at large for the murder. Ong's brother stated he initially found closure with Khor's capture in 2003, but the later discharge of Khor, who insisted on his innocence, without a trial once again made him feel heartbroken for his brother, thinking that justice was not served for his brother, who died an unjust death.

== Appeal and execution ==
On 26 September 2005, 52-year-old Khor Kok Soon's appeal against his death sentence was dismissed by the Court of Appeal. The three judges - Chief Justice Yong Pung How, High Court judge Choo Han Teck and Judge of Appeal Chao Hick Tin - agreed that the trial judge Kan Ting Chiu had not erred in placing weight on the evidence of both Sergeant Lim Kiah Chin and SI Cyril Sta Maria rather than the inconsistent accounts delivered by Khor in court and to the police, and upheld his death sentence because Khor indeed fired the shot intentionally at Sergeant Lim with an attempt to injure him. Khor reportedly became emotional and once again proclaimed his innocence over the death of Ong King Hock.

It was confirmed through a 2007 crime documentary that Khor Kok Soon was hanged at Changi Prison sometime after losing his appeal, although the exact date of his execution in 2006 was not specified. Prison statistics revealed in 2012 that out of the eight hangings in 2006, the same year when Khor was put to death, there were two people, including Khor, who were hanged for firearm-related offences within Singapore's jurisdiction.

== Aftermath ==
=== Current status of Ong King Hock's murder ===
The murder of Ong King Hock officially remains unsolved as of today, as Khor, who has since been hanged, was not tried or convicted for the crime, and he denied his guilt, stating he could not possibly kill Ong by shooting him in the right side of the neck while sitting on the left side—even though it was possible for Khor, in the pathologist's opinion, to sling his arm around Ong's neck to shoot him on the right side of the neck. Also, Khor's gun was of .22 calibre, yet the bullet was measured to be larger than .22 calibre, and it was not confirmed if Khor might have a second gun in his possession, and the gunshot Khor heard before Ong was killed came from behind the lorry and not the side of the lorry despite the fact that the police were confirmed to not have caused Ong's death while opening fire at Khor during the pursuit.

=== In popular media ===
In the aftermath of Khor Kok Soon's trial and execution, the Singaporean crime show True Files re-enacted the Shenton Way incident and the trial of Khor. The re-enactment first aired on 4 March 2007 as the eighth episode of the show's fifth and final season. Khor's former lawyer Edmond Pereira agreed to be interviewed on the show, and he told the producers of the show that Khor deeply regretted his involvement in the shoot-out, and he was also remorseful about the death of Ong King Hock, whom he denied killing but nonetheless felt sad for his death, since he only held Ong hostage for the sake of escaping the police before the lorry driver ended up dead as a result of his actions.

Veteran journalist Ho Yuen (何盈 He Ying), who penned several books about some serious crimes that occurred in Singapore in the past, also wrote about the case of Khor Kok Soon in his 2016 volume of Crime Scene, a series of books that recount the true crimes of Singapore that shook the nation over the years.

== See also ==
- Arms Offences Act
- Capital punishment in Singapore
