= Arms Offences Act =

Statute of the Parliament of Singapore

Arms Offences Act 1973
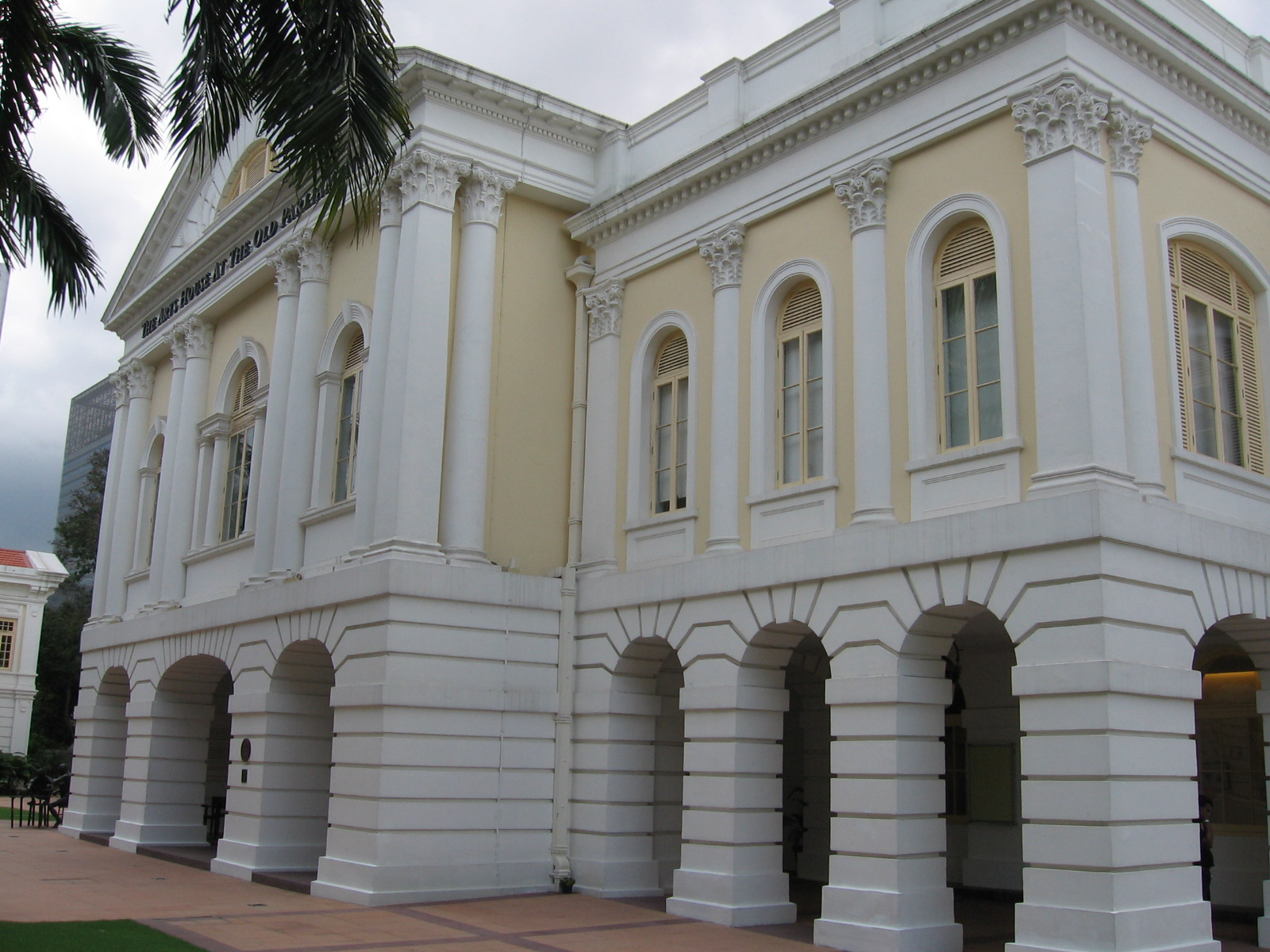

Parliament of Singapore
- Long title: An Act relating to the unlawful possession of arms and ammunition and the carrying and using of arms.
- Enacted by: Parliament of Singapore
- Enacted: 1973

Amended by
- 31 March 2008
- Status: In force

The Arms Offences Act 1973 is a statute of the Parliament of Singapore that criminalizes the illegal possession of arms and ammunition and the carrying, trafficking, and usage of arms. The law is designed specifically to make acts of ownership, knowingly receiving payment in connection with the trade of a trafficked armaments and ammunition, as well as the unlawful usage of arms and ammunition a criminal offence.

== Overview ==
The Arms Offences Act is an Act to deter unlawful ownership, trafficking and use of arms and ammunition. It was originally enacted in 1973.

The Arms Offences Act defines the punishment to be meted out for different scenarios of violations, and serves as an instrument for the imprisonment and caning of offenders. Apart from unlawful possession of arms or ammunition, illegal usage of arms in particular the committing of a scheduled offence, the Act also prescribes punishment for accomplices and individuals who consort with offenders and traffickers.

== Uses of the Act ==
The first person to be charged and convicted under the Act was Sha Bakar Dawood. He was sentenced to death in 1975 for shooting and wounding three people at a brothel and then opening fire at police at Thiam Siew Avenue.

=== Andrew Road triple murders ===
The Arms Offences Act has also played a part in the 1983 high-profile Andrew Road triple murders, which were committed by 19-year-old NS conscript Sek Kim Wah. In this case, on 23 July 1983, Sek, together with an accomplice Nyu Kok Meng, also aged 19, armed themselves with a rifle which Sek stole from his army camp in Nee Soon and went to rob a rich businessman's house in Andrew Road and took the businessman and four other people - the wife, daughter, maid and the daughter's Chinese language tutor - hostage. In an attempt to eliminate witnesses after robbing the family, Sek murdered three of the hostages, namely the businessman himself, along with his wife and maid. Filled with horror upon witnessing his accomplice's actions, Nyu locked himself in a room with the remaining two hostages (the tutor and the daughter) and the rifle to protect the girl and teacher from Sek's murderous rampage. When Sek gave up trying to barge into the locked room to kill the others and escaped, Nyu released the businessman's daughter and her tutor after telling them to inform the police and Sek's address before he himself escaped. The following police investigations of the case led to Sek's arrest six days after the crime and Nyu later surrendered to the police.

Initially charged with murder, Nyu Kok Meng was subsequently tried and convicted under the Arms Offences Act for using a firearm to commit armed robbery in July 1985, and sentenced to serve life in prison with 6 strokes of the cane, while Sek was sentenced to death in a separate trial for the triple murders at Andrew Road on 14 August 1985. Sek, who was found to be also responsible for an unsolved double murder at East Coast Park, was later hanged on 9 December 1988.

Since life imprisonment meant a fixed imprisonment of 20 years, with one-third reduction of the sentence for good behaviour under Singapore law before 1997, Nyu was most likely released after serving full his life sentence since July 2005.

=== Shenton Way shooting incident ===
In July 1984, in Shenton Way, gunman Khor Kok Soon had fired three shots at police officers chasing him before he managed to escape in a lorry, forcing a lorry driver to drive him to safety. The driver, 25-year-old Ong King Hock, was found fatally shot in his lorry, which was abandoned at an alley (but Khor had escaped by the time the lorry was found). Khor, who evaded capture for the next 19 years, was arrested in Malaysia on 27 December 2003 and extradited back to Singapore for trial. He was charged for firing his gun thrice under this Act (as well as the murder of the lorry driver) and in February 2005, Khor was sentenced to hang. The case, known as the Shenton Way shooting incident, was re-enacted in True Files.

=== Tan Chor Jin ===
On 9 January 2009, 42-year-old gunman Tan Chor Jin (AKA: the One-eyed Dragon) was hanged in Changi Prison for fatally shooting 41-year-old nightclub owner Lim Hock Soon in 15 February 2006. Initially charged with murder, Tan was sentenced to death for unlawfully discharging his firearm under the Arms Offences Act (under this Act, anyone who unlawfully discharged a firearm in Singapore, even with no intention to kill, would face the mandatory death penalty).

=== Khoo Teck Puat Hospital shooting incident ===
Muhammad Iskandar Sa'at was also charged in June 2015 under the Arms Offences Act after discharging three rounds from a .38-calibre Taurus revolver at a policeman in a private room at Khoo Teck Puat Hospital during a struggle in the hospital room. He had allegedly also hit the police officer repeatedly with a T-baton and a metal pole used for securing an intravenous drip. Iskandar was eventually sentenced to life imprisonment and 18 strokes of the cane for a lesser charge of unlawful possession of a firearm to cause hurt to a public servant, which carries a mandatory life sentence with caning between 6 and 24 strokes of the cane under the Arms Offences.

== See also ==
- Capital punishment in Singapore
- Life imprisonment in Singapore
- Caning in Singapore
