= Murder of Suk Malasri =

1995 murder of a Thai forklift operator in Singapore

- Thongbai Naklangdon, the Thai welder who was hanged for murdering his friend and colleague Suk Malasri
- Location: Sungei Kadut, Singapore
- Date: 17 June 1995
- Attack type: Murder
- Weapon: Iron pipe
- Deaths: 1
- Injuries: 0
- Victim: Suk Malasri (23)
- Perpetrator: Thongbai Naklangdon (28)
- Motive: Fearful of victim's threat to seek revenge
- Charges: Murder
- Verdict: Thongbai found guilty of murder Sentenced to death on 17 November 1995; Hanged on 30 August 1996
- Convictions: Murder
- Convicted: Thongbai Naklangdon (28)
- Judge: Amarjeet Singh (Judicial commissioner)

On 17 June 1995, 23-year-old Thai forklift operator Suk Malasri (1972 – 17 June 1995) was found bludgeoned to death inside his living quarters at a construction site in Sungei Kadut, Singapore. The police managed to identify and arrest a suspect three days after the murder, and the killer, a welder named Thongbai Naklangdon (1967 – 30 August 1996), confessed to murdering Suk after the victim threatened to seek revenge over a previous physical assault he suffered from four of his colleagues. Although Thongbai later recanted his confession and also claimed that he killed Suk in self-defence during an alleged fight between the both of them, Thongbai was found guilty of murdering Suk and sentenced to death by the High Court, which rejected his defence. Thongbai's appeal was dismissed, and he was hanged on 30 August 1996.

== Murder investigation ==
On 17 June 1995, at a construction site in Singapore's Sungei Kadut, a Thai national was found murdered inside his sleeping quarters.

The victim was identified as 23-year-old Suk Malasri, who was a forklift operator employed at the same site where his murder took place. He was found half-naked and clad in his shorts, with his head bloodied. The police, who happened to arrive at the site to respond to an incident of arson, discovered the death of Suk when they were seeking his assistance in their investigations, given that Suk was a suspect in this unrelated case. Upon this discovery, the death of Suk was classified as murder, and at least 40 construction workers present at the site were rounded up for questioning, although 27 of them were detained in police custody for the purpose of investigations.

It was revealed that prior to the murder, there had been an alleged dispute between Suk and some other workers over a prostitute, and during an argument in midst of a drinking session, Suk reportedly broke a bottle of strong alcohol and started a fire, which caused one of the other co-workers to get burnt on his left arm, legs and body, and the co-worker, who was the one and only victim in this arson case, was sent to Singapore General Hospital for treatment, where his condition was stabilized by the time the police investigators, led by Richard Lim Beng Gee, began to take up the case. Also, it was reported that the Thai workers employed and residing in that area would often gather together for drinks on the 16th and/or 17th day of each month, when their monthly salaries were paid to them, and prostitutes would also be engaged regularly during these sessions, which also saw drunken fights occurring between the workers.

A forensic pathologist conducted an autopsy on Suk, and it was discovered that Suk suffered multiple head injuries that were caused by a blunt object and inflicted about four to five times with great force. The injuries of Suk, based on the pathologist's findings, were sufficient in the ordinary course of nature to cause the death of Suk.

After three days of investigation, the police managed to arrest a suspect behind the murder. The suspect, who was Suk's 27-year-old colleague and welder Thongbai Naklangdon, was charged with murder, and he also brought the police back to the crime scene, where they recovered an iron rod, which was the same murder weapon used by Thongbai, who confessed during investigations that he indeed killed Suk.

== Trial of Thongbai Naklangdon ==
On 31 October 1995, 28-year-old Thongbai Naklangdon was brought to trial at the High Court for the murder of Suk Malasri four months prior. Two defence lawyers, Shashi Nathan and Ismail Hamid, were assigned by the state to represent Thongbai during his trial, which was slated to run for five days. The prosecution was led by Lau Wing Yum, and the trial was presided over by Judicial Commissioner Amarjeet Singh.

The trial court was told that prior to the murder, there had been a past dispute that led to a physical assault, which also resulted in the murder of Suk Malasri. On the eve of the murder, Suk reportedly used a knife to threaten the girlfriend of one of his colleagues, and coerced her into having sex with him. While he was attempting to rape the woman, Suk's attempt was cut short by a colleague who stepped in to prevent it. Suk was filled with vengeance over this failure and thus, during a drinking session among the Thai workers in their workplace later that night, Suk deliberately smashed a bottle of strong liquor and used his lighter to start a fire, which caused one of his co-workers to get burned and sent to the hospital. This sparked an outrage among the other Thai workers present at the session, and four of them assaulted Suk to punish him. At the end of the assault, Suk remained defiant and he coldly swore revenge against those who assaulted him.

One of the prosecution's witnesses was Wilai, a Thai worker who went to tend Suk, who was injured on the head due to the earlier assault. Wilai testified that at around 4 am, while Suk was asleep and Wilai himself remained by his side, Thongbai, who was a good friend of Suk, entered the quarters and he aggressively compelled Wilai to come with him to have more drinks or to go to bed, and Wilai chose to go along with Thongbai to drink. During the next 30 minutes or so during the party, Wilai noticed Thongbai leaving the party twice at irregular points of time before he finally returned and stayed on throughout the rest of the session. Dam, another Thai worker who also appeared as a witness, testified that about 30 minutes after Wilai left the sleeping Suk alone, he went into the quarters to check on Suk, and he discovered that Suk had died. When Dam told the others about the grisly finding, Thongbai simply asked him to remain silent and ordered that everyone go back to sleep. Two hours later, the police, having interviewed the Thai worker who was hospitalized for his burns, proceeded to the site to bring him in for investigations, but ended up discovering his murder and hence began their investigations into the present case. Based on Thongbai's confession, the prosecution adduced that Thongbai felt threatened by Suk's vow of revenge, and he thus took an iron pipe and wielded it to batter Suk to death with at least three blows to Suk's head while Suk was still asleep in the quarters, which effectively placed Thongbai at the scene of crime.

Thongbai was later called to give his defence, and he elected to do so. On the stand, Thongbai recanted parts of his confession and he denied that he was the one who killed Suk Malasri. He claimed that he had indeed assaulted Suk but he insisted that prior to this assault, it was the deceased victim Suk who first kicked Thongbai on his groin and wanted to attack Thongbai, which caused Thongbai to swing the pipe at Suk and hit him once or twice, and Suk only fell onto the bed after getting hit. Thongbai claimed that it might have been another person coming into the bedroom after his departure to finish off Suk, and that his actions only constituted as an offence of voluntarily causing grievous hurt rather than murder. Aside from this, Thongbai also raised alternative defences to help his case should the court consider him to be the killer of Suk, and he mainly argued that it was a killing done out of self-defense during a sudden fight, and he was also under sudden and grave provocation at the time of the offence.

On 17 November 1995, Judicial Commissioner Amarjeet Singh delivered his verdict. In his judgement, Judicial Commissioner Singh found that Thongbai was indeed responsible for murdering Suk Malasri, and it was not likely that another person had entered the sleeping quarters and killed Suk after Thongbai assaulted him and left the scene. The judge thus rejected Thongbai's story, and he also refused to even consider convicting Thongbai of a lesser charge of voluntarily causing grievous hurt with a dangerous weapon. With regards to the defences raised by Thongbai, Judicial Commissioner Singh also rejected them on the facts that the accused's testimony totally lacked credibility and they did not hold much weight in the defence's case. The judge additionally ruled that the evidence was inherently clear in proving that Thongbai had intentionally and, with premeditation, inflicted severe head injuries on Suk, such that the injuries were sufficient in the ordinary course of nature to cause death, and on these grounds, Judicial Commissioner Singh concluded that the prosecution had proven its case beyond a reasonable doubt, and there were sufficient grounds to return with a guilty verdict of murder in Thongbai's case.

As such, 28-year-old Thongbai Naklangdon was found guilty of murder, and sentenced to death by hanging. Prior to 2013, the death penalty was mandated for murder under Singaporean law.

== Appeal ==
After he was sentenced to hang, Thongbai Naklangdon appealed to the Court of Appeal against his murder conviction and death sentence. In the appeal itself, the defence counsel raised the same defences used by Thongbai during his trial for murder, and they also argued that Judicial Commissioner Singh should have given due consideration in Thongbai's statements of striking the victim once or twice instead of unequivocally relying on the forensic pathologist's opinion that four to five blows were inflicted to cause the fatal head injuries on Suk Malasri.

On 8 January 1996, Thongbai's appeal was dismissed by the Court of Appeal. The three judges - Chief Justice Yong Pung How, and Judges of Appeal L P Thean (Thean Lip Ping) and M Karthigesu - found that the judicial commissioner was correct to reject Thongbai's testimony and rely on his police statements, and they noted that Thongbai failed to mention the alleged fight preceding the death of Suk in any of his statements, and the original trial judge had the right to draw inferences he saw fit from the evidence he felt should be relied on in spite of the discrepancies. Noting that motive was not a prerequisite to guilt, the appellate court determined that Thongbai had gone to approach Suk with the intent to stop him from wreaking further havoc among the construction workers and his claim of having struck Suk only once or twice was inconsistent with the evidence, which showed that the injuries were intentionally inflicted through four or five blows and they were sufficient in the ordinary course of nature to cause death. On these findings, the Court of Appeal unanimously turned down Thongbai's appeal and hence confirmed the death penalty in his case.

== Execution ==
Thongbai Naklangdon was hanged in Changi Prison at dawn on 30 August 1996. Thongbai, who was 28 years old at the time of his execution, was put to death alongside three other death row prisoners, who all also lost their appeals before they were executed. One of them was also from Thailand like Thongbai, a 24-year-old farmer named Jeerasak Densakul, who was convicted of smuggling 2.2 kg of marijuana in April 1995; the second was 36-year-old prostitute Teo Kim Hong, who was charged with stabbing her Malaysian colleague Ching Bee Ing to death in August 1995; and the third was 29-year-old hotel worker Zainal Abidin Abdul Malik, who was found guilty of murdering a police officer named Boo Tiang Huat in November 1994.

Thongbai was one of the ten people convicted of murder (also including British serial killer John Martin Scripps and the five construction site murderers from Thailand) to be hanged in the year 1996. Coupled with the executions of 40 drug traffickers (also including Malaysian drug traffickers Rozman Jusoh and Razali Mat Zin), a total of 50 death row convicts were executed in Singapore during the year of 1996 itself.

== Aftermath ==
In the aftermath, the judgement of Thongbai's appeal, titled Thongbai Naklangdon v Public Prosecutor, was used as a case study by legal professionals in Singapore. In the appeal ruling itself, certain points were brought up in Thongbai's case, where the Court of Appeal ruled that motive was not a prerequisite of guilt, and any trial judge in whichever case is entitled to rely on inconsistent parts of the evidence that he/she found fit to do so and felt could be the truthful facts of the said case. It was also clarified through the Thongbai case and other referred cases that even a retracted confession could be used as evidence to convict an accused of whichever crime he was charged and tried for, should the court be satisfied that the retracted confession was the truth. The appeal case of Thongbai was referred to by certain court verdicts like the Mohamed Aliff Mohamed Yusoff case, the Nadasan Chandra Secharan case, and the Mohammed Ali Johari case.

== See also ==
- Capital punishment in Singapore
