= Murder of Thampusamy Murugian Gunasekaran =

1993 murder of an airport employee in Singapore

Thampusamy Murugian Gunasekaran
- Born: Thampusamy Murugian Gunasekaran; 1959; Colony of Singapore
- Died: 25 October 1993 (aged 34); Chander Road, Little India, Singapore
- Cause of death: Skull fracture
- Occupation: Operation assistant
- Employer: Changi Airport
- Known for: Murder victim

On 25 October 1993, 34-year-old airport operation assistant Thampusamy Murugian Gunasekaran was murdered by three men while he and his friend were having supper at a coffee shop at Little India's Chander Road; the friend was also attacked but survived with minor injuries. Six months later, one of the assailants was charged with murder after he gave himself up to the police. The suspect, Anbuarsu Joseph, was found guilty of murdering Thampusamy and sentenced to death in August 1994, and he was hanged on 7 July 1995. Anbuarsu's two accomplices, who were yet to be identified, remained at large as of today.

== Murder investigation ==
=== Attack and murder ===
On 25 October 1993, at about 2.45am, at a 24-hour coffee shop along Chander Road (located in Little India), two patrons of the shop were brutally attacked by a group of armed men, and both were left injured and rushed to Tan Tock Seng Hospital after the incident. One of the two victims sustained severe head injuries, and less than five hours after the attack, the first victim, identified as Thampusamy Murugian Gunasekaran, died at the age of 34. On the other hand, 41-year-old Murugear Singaram, who was the second victim and Thampusamy's Malaysian friend, survived the brutal attack with slight head injuries and he received six stitches.

According to witnesses, Thampusamy and Murugear were having their supper at the coffee shop when the three attackers approached the both of them while armed. Two of the assailants, described as one male Indian armed with an axe and a male Chinese armed with an iron pipe, sprung into action and assaulted both Murugear and Thampusamy, and the third assailant (described to be a male Indian) remained outside the coffee shop and never participate in the violent assault. After the attack, the trio left the scene in a vehicle, leaving both the victims behind. The attack brought shock to the patrons and other witnesses, and the murder of Thampusamy was the second incident of violence to take place at the coffee shop in about two months. According to Murugear's 18-year-old daughter, her father first knew and befriended Thampusamy earlier the same month before the murder, and Thampusamy's family said he was single and did not live with them. At the time of his death, Thampusamy was employed as an operation assistant at Changi Airport.

=== Autopsy report and police investigation ===
According to Professor Chao Tzee Cheng, the forensic pathologist who performed an autopsy on Thampusamy's corpse, he testified that there were about three or four injuries being inflicted on Thampusamy's head, and this led to a broken skull that caused the death of Thampusamy. He said the first blow was likely caused by an axe, while the subsequent blows were caused by either an axe or a parang. The police classified the case as murder, and swiftly conduct their investigations and a nationwide manhunt for the three suspects, while at the same time appealing for witnesses who had information that may lead to the arrest of the three suspects. The investigations were led by Inspector T Maniam (who retired later that same year), a police detective who would become a victim of murder in 1999 when his second wife Julaiha Begum ordered her boyfriend and his friends to kill him; Julaiha and two of her hired killers were charged with murder and sentenced to death, and hanged on 16 February 2001.

== Trial of Anbuarsu Joseph ==
=== Arrest of Anbuarsu ===
Anbuarsu Joseph
- Born: Anbuarsu Joseph c. 1963; Singapore
- Died: 7 July 1995 (aged 32); Changi Prison, Singapore
- Cause of death: Execution by hanging
- Occupation: Scaffolder
- Status: Executed
- Allegiance: Gi Leng Kiat (former)
- Motive: To attack members of rival gang Ang Soon Tong
- Conviction: Murder (one count)
- Criminal charges: Murder (one count)
- Penalty: Death by hanging

On 2 March 1994, a man surrendered himself to the police, and he admitted that he was one of the three alleged murderers behind the death of Thampusamy Murugian Gunasekaran. The man, a Singaporean scaffolder named Anbuarsu Joseph, became the first suspect of the case to be charged with murder. Anbuarsu was also revealed to be the leader of an infamous gang known as Gi Leng Kiat (also spelt Ghee Leng Kiat). At that point, however, Anbuarsu's accomplices, who were never identified, remained on the run for the murder.

=== Trial and defence ===
On 8 August 1994, Anbuarsu stood trial for the murder of Thampusamy. Anbuarsu was represented by both R Gunaretnam and Loo Ngan Chor, while the prosecution consisted of Jasbendar Kaur and Lawrence Wong. Veteran judge T S Sinnathuray was appointed to hear Anbuarsu's case in the High Court, where those charged with murder or other capital offences were brought to trial.

The prosecution's case was that Anbuarsu, who was identified as the person who used an axe to kill Thampusamy (even though he confessed to using a parang instead of an axe like what the witnesses claimed), shared the common intention with his two accomplices to launch an attack on members of the rival gang Ang Soon Tong, but both Thampusamy and his friend were not part of the Ang Soon Tong and yet Anbuarsu and his accomplices mistook them for being so, resulting in the brutal attack on both the men. The prosecution also submitted that Anbuarsu should be convicted of murder on the grounds that he intentionally inflicted the fatal head injuries to cause Thampusamy's death with the purpose of meeting the intention to attack those he perceived to be rival gang members.

However, during his trial, Anbuarsu denied that he surrendered himself to the police because of the murder, and he claimed that when he arrived at the Clementi police station, he was there to surrender himself for possession of dangerous weapons (which he brought to the station) and not murder. Anbuarsu also totally denied committing the murder and even denied ever being present at the crime scene (in fact, he led the police to the crime scene to re-enact hs crime). Anbuarsu said his only purpose of surrendering himself was to get curfew hours to avoid contact with his creditors and fellow secret society friends, but it caused him to be charged with murder with no reason, and Anbuarsu was being physically assaulted by the police during his time in custody, which forced him to confess to the murder while under duress.

=== Verdict ===
After a trial lasting nine days, Justice Sinnathuray delivered his verdict on 19 August 1994. He found that Anbuarsu's confession was made out of voluntariness and he was not coerced by the police into falsifying his confession since the medical screening during Anbuarsu's remand did not reveal any physical injuries on his body. Justice Sinnathuray also said that he was satisfied beyond a reasonable doubt that Anbuarsu had intentionally used an axe to bludgeon Thampusamy on the head, such that the fractures on Thampusamy's skull were sufficient in the ordinary course of nature to cause death, and that Anbuarsu had done so while he acted in furtherance of the common intention with his accomplices to attack those they perceived to be rival gang members present in that area. Therefore, these findings in Anbuarsu's case were sufficient grounds for the trial judge to return with a verdict of murder.

As a result, 31-year-old Anbuarsu Joseph was found guilty of murder, and sentenced to death. Under Singaporean law, an offender guilty of murder would be given the death penalty, which was the mandatory punishment for murder.

== Anbuarsu's execution ==
=== Appeal ===
After he was sentenced to death, Anbuarsu filed an appeal against his conviction and sentence. But the Court of Appeal rejected his appeal on 6 February 1995. The three judges - Chief Justice Yong Pung How, and two Judges of Appeal L P Thean (Thean Lip Ping) and M Karthigesu - upheld the murder conviction and death sentence, stating that Anbuarsu had confessed to murdering Thampusamy on four occasions during his questioning by police, and that his alleged claims of confessing under duress and police abuse were unsupported by medical opinion, which found no physical injury on him, and they thus rejected the defence's contention that the trial judge was erred in ruling his statements as admissible in the case.

=== Clemency plea and hanging ===
Subsequently, as a final recourse to evade the gallows, Anbuarsu filed a motion for presidential clemency, which would allow his death sentence to be commuted to life imprisonment if successful. However, on 5 May 1995, then President Ong Teng Cheong decided to reject Anbuarsu's clemency plea.

On 7 July 1995, 32-year-old Anbuarsu Joseph was hanged in Changi Prison at dawn.

Two other prisoners were executed on the same date as Anbuarsu after the loss of their respective appeals. One of them was 43-year-old heroin smuggler Goh Soon Huat while another was 28-year-old murder convict Sagar Suppiah Retnam. In Goh's case, he was caught trafficking 69.34g of heroin at a shopping mall on 4 April 1994, and subsequently sentenced to death on 25 October 1994, and a three-judge Court of Appeal rejected Goh's appeal in February 1995. In Sagar's case, he was a former headman of infamous gang Ang Soon Tong and was given the death sentence in May 1994 for murdering a 20-year-old bystander during a gang clash in December 1990, an incident which also led to the conviction and imprisonment of 13 other people (including the transvestite-killer Soosay Sinnappen) for rioting and causing grievous hurt.

Till today, Anbuarsu remains the only person convicted for killing Thampusamy to date, as the remaining two attackers were never caught.

== See also ==
- Capital punishment in Singapore
