= Johore Road transvestite murder =

1990 death of a transvestite in Singapore

Lim Yeow Chuan
- Born: Lim Yeow Chuan c. 1960; Pontian District, Johor, Malaysia
- Died: 27 October 1990 (aged 30); Johore Road, Bugis, Singapore
- Cause of death: Two fatal knife wounds to the abdomen
- Other name: Susan
- Education: Secondary school education in Malaysia
- Occupations: Fashion designer (former); Transvestite
- Known for: Murder victim

On 27 October 1990, a thirty-year-old Malaysian named Lim Yeow Chuan (Chinese: 林耀全; pinyin: Lín Yàoquán; Pe̍h-ōe-jī: Lîm Iāu-choân), who was a transvestite, was found dead at Johore Road within Bugis, where it was a hotspot for prostitution of transvestites prior to its demolition in the 1990s. According to her colleagues, Lim was last seen with two young Indian men before she was discovered dead. In January 1991, two suspects - consisting of one Malaysian and one Singaporean - were arrested and charged with her murder. Later, while the Singaporean suspect Kuppiah s/o Saravanan was sentenced to five years' jail and twelve strokes of the cane for robbery, the Malaysian suspect Soosay a/l Sinnappen remained facing a murder charge.

It was revealed that both Soosay and Kuppiah robbed Lim due to Lim having stolen both the money and a gold chain from their friend, who was Lim's former customer, and they wanted to help the friend to get the chain back, resulting in an altercation between the men and Lim, who used a knife to threaten and attack them, which sparked into a fight that took Lim's life. Soosay, who argued that he acted in self-defence and killed Lim during a sudden fight, was sentenced to death by the trial court for murder in November 1992. However, upon his appeal, Soosay's claims of causing Lim's death during a sudden fight were accepted by the Court of Appeal, which resulted in Soosay's sentence being reduced to nine years' imprisonment for manslaughter in August 1993.

== Death of Lim Yeow Chuan ==
On the early morning hours of 27 October 1990, at Johore Road in Singapore's Bugis Street, a transvestite was found dead by one of her colleagues at an alley in Queen Street, wearing a black dress and sustaining several stab wounds on her body. According to the forensic pathologist, two out of five wounds were fatal and these resulted in the victim bleeding to death.

The victim, who was pronounced dead at Singapore General Hospital, was identified as 30-year-old Lim Yeow Chuan, a Malaysian born in Pontian. The youngest of eight children, Lim first came to Singapore at least four years prior to her death (classified as murder), and after she resigned from her fashion designer job, Lim had worked as a transvestite since, dressing up in women's clothes and provided prostitution services. Before she died, Lim, who sported feminine facial features and a feminine personality, hoped to earn enough money to undergo a sex change operation in Germany, as she wanted to be a woman. She was known as "Susan" to her fellow other transvestite colleagues. According to witnesses, Lim was last seen with two Indian men at a back alley before her alleged murder, which was likely committed with robbery as a motive, due to the fact that a gold chain and Lim's handbag were both missing. The same two Indian men were also last seen rushing to board a taxi to leave the area prior to the discovery of Lim's lifeless body.

About two months after Lim was murdered, the police managed to arrest two suspects allegedly responsible for the killing. One of them was a trainee prison warden named Kuppiah Saravanan, a 21-year-old Singaporean. The other was 23-year-old Soosay Sinnappen, an unemployed Malaysian originally from Johor, Malaysia. Soosay was arrested at his flat in Jurong West on 30 December 1990 while Kuppiah was caught at Sembawang the next day on 31 December. Both men were charged with murder on 2 January 1991. It was learned by police after the pair's arrest that Lim allegedly stole a gold chain and money from a friend of the two suspects, who confronted Lim on that night to retrieve the gold chain.

Additionally, Soosay, who was allegedly a member of the infamous gang Ang Soon Tong, was found to be one of the fourteen gang members responsible for killing a 20-year-old bystander during a gang clash. Therefore, a second preliminary charge of murder was tendered against Soosay for the death of the 20-year-old victim, who was identified as a Malaysian machine operator named Sivapragasam Subramaniam.

== Trial of Kuppiah Saravanan ==
On 31 August 1992, 23-year-old Kuppiah Saravanan was brought to trial for a reduced charge of robbery with hurt. Kuppiah pleaded guilty to the reduced charge and in his mitigation plea, Kuppiah highlighted through his lawyer that he did the act under a "misguided sense of righteousness" to help one of their friends to recover a gold chain from the victim Lim Yeow Chuan, who allegedly stole it from the same friend.

In sentencing Kuppiah to five years' imprisonment and twelve strokes of the cane, the trial judge, Judicial Commissioner Amarjeet Singh, accepted that Kuppiah had backed out of the fight halfway upon seeing the victim getting stabbed, and was unaware that Soosay was allegedly in possession of a knife when confronting Lim and getting into a fight with Lim.

However, Soosay's murder charge was not reduced, and he remained in remand pending trial for this original charge. If found guilty of murder, Soosay would receive the mandatory death sentence for this offence.

== Trial of Soosay Sinnappen ==
Soosay Sinnappen
- Born: Soosay a/l Sinnappen c. 1967; Johor, Malaysia
- Status: Released
- Allegiance: Ang Soon Tong (former)
- Convictions: Culpable homicide not amounting to murder (one count); Rioting or Causing grievous hurt (one count)
- Criminal charges: Murder (two counts)
- Penalty: Nine years' imprisonment (1993); Four years' imprisonment and six strokes of the cane (1993)

The trial of Soosay Sinnappen took place at the High Court on 19 October 1992. Mathavan Devadas was the prosecutor of the trial, while N K Rajarh was Soosay's defence lawyer. Judicial Commissioner M P H Rubin was the trial judge presiding Soosay's case.

In his trial, Soosay recounted in English (as attributed to his secondary school education) that he never meant to kill Lim, and stated that he was acting in self-defense and the killing was a result of a sudden fight. According to Soosay, on 25 October 1990, while Soosay himself, together with Kuppiah and a third friend named Leo Chin Hwang (廖振煌 Liào Zhènhuáng; alias Ah Koo), were drinking beer at Johore Road, they were approached by a group of transvestites and transgender prostitutes who offered them sexual services, and Leo agreed to go with one of them, who was identified to be Lim.

The next day, an upset Leo met up with both Kuppiah and Soosay, stating that he lost his gold chain and his money, and said that Lim had possibly drugged him while they were drinking beer and may have stolen the money and gold chain while Leo was unconscious in the bed at one of the hotel rooms in the area. Leo stated that he wanted to have the gold chain back, because it was a gift from his wife on their wedding day, and asked for the help of both Soosay and Kuppiah to get it back. After Leo pointed out Lim among the transvestites for the two of them on the night of 26 October, hours before midnight when Lim was killed, both Soosay and Kuppiah devised a plan to retrieve the gold chain, starting with Kuppiah pretending to approach Lim with the intent to get sexual services from Lim and to bring her to another spot in Queen Street to negotiate with Lim to get the gold chain back.

However, the plan itself did not work well, as Lim refused to cooperate and even denied stealing the gold chain. To make matters worse, Lim suddenly brandished a knife by taking it out of her handbag and threatened them, and additionally, Lim spewed vulgarities and insulted both the mothers of Soosay and Kuppiah in sheer defiance. The heated quarrel resulted in the exchange of blows between Lim and the two men, with Lim starting the fight. Although Kuppiah managed to snatch away the gold chain around Lim's neck and the handbag, Soosay remained entangled in the struggle with Lim, and according to Soosay, he was forced to disarm Lim and after grabbing the knife, he stabbed Lim several times in self-defense in an attempt to release himself from the tussle. Soosay also did so after Lim, despite her wounds, tried to charge at Soosay to attack him, before Soosay finally escaped the scene and got into the taxi hailed by Kuppiah, and both of them thus fled on the taxi to Paya Lebar MRT station. This account was corroborated by Kuppiah, who came to court as a trial witness in midst of serving his five-year sentence at Changi Prison.

On 2 November 1992, the trial judge, Judicial Commissioner M P H Rubin, delivered his verdict. In his judgement, JC Rubin found that Soosay had not successfully proven that his actions of killing Lim were a result of a sudden fight or self-defense, given that Soosay had exceeded the right to self-defense when he inflicted not one, but five knife wounds, in which two of them had led to Lim's death. He also felt that Soosay had unduly acted in a cruel and unusual manner and taken undue advantage in the supposed fight he had with Lim, and since Soosay had indeed intentionally inflicted the wounds on Lim, such that two of them were sufficient in the ordinary course of nature to cause death, Soosay was considered guilty for murder under the law.

As a result, 25-year-old Soosay Sinnappen was found guilty of murder, and sentenced to death. According to news reports, Soosay was seen on the verge of crying as he heard the judge pronouncing the death sentence on him, and Soosay's mother, who travelled from Malaysia to Singapore with her family members to hear the verdict, was devastated to hear that her son was sentenced to hang, and she was hysterical to the point that friends and relatives had to support her and escort her out of the courtroom. Soosay's second charge of murder for killing 20-year-old Sivapragasam Subramaniam during a gang fight was withdrawn by the prosecution since he was effectively under a death sentence for another murder, and a discharge not amounting to an acquittal was granted to Soosay as a result.

== Soosay's appeal ==
On 18 May 1993, while he was on death row at Changi Prison, Soosay filed an appeal to the Court of Appeal against his conviction and sentence, where three judges - Chief Justice Yong Pung How, and Judges of Appeal M Karthigesu and Goh Joon Seng - were chaired to hear the appeal, in which Soosay, through his new lawyer R Palakrishnan, asked the court to reconsider his defence of sudden fight and self-defence, while the prosecution rebutted that Soosay had clearly committed murder since he exceeded his right to self defence and had taken undue advantage against the victim during the fight.

On 10 August 1993, the Court of Appeal delivered their verdict, with Justice Karthigesu pronouncing the judgement in court. In their verdict, Justice Karthigesu stated that while they agreed with the trial judge that Soosay had indeed exceeded his right to self-defense on the account that he evidently inflicted more harm than necessary when stabbing the 30-year-old victim Lim Yeow Chuan multiple times, they found that the trial judge had not adequately taken Soosay's defence of a sudden fight into due consideration before reaching the verdict. Therefore, they reviewed Soosay's claims and found that his defence of a sudden fight should be accepted and his murder conviction cannot stand.

Explaining the reason why they accepted Soosay's claims of sudden fight, Justice Karthigesu said that based on the evidence, it was Lim who started the fight and was the aggressor in the case, despite Soosay managing to disarm Lim at one point. They found that the fight was not premeditated by Soosay in recovering the gold chain, since the fight started from the heated quarrel between Lim, Soosay and the accomplice Kuppiah Saravanan, and Lim taking out the knife to threaten both Soosay and Kuppiah. Aside from this, they found that the knife belonged to Lim, in contrast to the prosecution's contention that the knife Soosay used to stab Lim to death was picked up from a nearby hawker stall.

Not only that, Justice Karthigesu also stated in the verdict that even after being stabbed, and having sustained two fatal wounds, Lim had continually attacked Soosay, such that it was not possible for Soosay to disengage himself from the fight, and the victim even gave chase after both Soosay and Kuppiah for over 180 yards before finally collapsing and dying from the wounds. Since Soosay was not armed beforehand, and that he has stabbed Lim during the fight, it led to the conclusion that Soosay did not have the premeditation to engage Lim in the fight, and never had the intention beforehand to commit murder. Furthermore, although Soosay had deliberately stabbed Lim several times during the fight, the Court of Appeal determined that in view of the circumstances leading up to the fight and the nature of the fight itself, there was no intention on Soosay's part to cause death, or to inflict any injuries that sufficiently result in death.

For these above reasons, the Court of Appeal set aside Soosay's death sentence and overturned his murder conviction, and instead, they found 26-year-old Soosay Sinnappen guilty of a lower charge of culpable homicide not amounting to murder (or manslaughter), and sentenced him to nine years' imprisonment under Section 304(b) of the Penal Code. The sentence was to take effect from the date of the appellate court's ruling in Soosay's case. Soosay was reportedly relieved after his sentence was reduced and smiled at his family, who were present in court.

== Aftermath ==
In the aftermath, while he was still serving his nine-year sentence at Changi Prison for killing Lim, Soosay, who was originally charged in the second case for killing 20-year-old Sivapragasam Subramaniam, became a witness during the trial of his gang leader Sagar Suppiah Retnam, who was charged with the murder by having used an axe to fatally strike Sivapragasam on the head and killing him. 27-year-old Sagar was found guilty of murder and sentenced to death on 31 May 1994, and he was hanged on 7 July 1995 after losing his appeal and clemency plea. Subsequently, the remaining twelve members of Soosay's gang were jailed between 31 months to seven years for reduced charges of rioting and causing grievous hurt with dangerous weapons. According to an episode of Crimewatch (which covered the Sivapragasam case), Soosay was given a four-year jail term and six strokes of the cane for a reduced charge of either rioting or inflicting grievous harm for his part in the murder of Sivapragasam; there was no mention of Soosay's involvement behind the death of Lim Yeow Chuan.

Sixteen years after the murder of Lim Yeow Chuan, Singaporean crime show True Files re-enacted the case and the murder trial of Soosay. The re-enactment first aired on 28 May 2006 as the ninth episode of the show's fourth season. Soosay's former lawyer N K Rajarh (who defended Soosay in his trial) agreed to be interviewed on the show, and Rajarh told the producers of the show that he felt Soosay and Kuppiah should have contacted the police to help them recover the gold chain instead of taking matters into their hands, which would not have resulted into both of them getting charged with Lim's murder before they ultimately escaped the gallows through the reduction of their charges. Additionally, the real-life police mugshots of both the offenders Kuppiah and Soosay were not shown in the episode to protect their identities, since both men were released from prison at this point. It was speculated that Soosay returned to Malaysia after his release.

The Court of Appeal's judgement in the case of Soosay was a notable legal case study in relation to the use of the partial defence of sudden fight against a murder charge in Singapore.

== See also ==
- Caning in Singapore
- Capital punishment in Singapore
