= Murder of Sivapragasam Subramaniam =

1990 murder of a bystander during a gang fight in Marsiling, Singapore

Sivapragasam Subramaniam
- Sivapragasam Subramaniam, who was murdered by the Ang Soon Tong
- Born: Sivapragasam a/l Subramaniam; 1970; Kuala Kangsar, Perak, Malaysia
- Died: 14 December 1990 (aged 20); Marsiling, Singapore
- Cause of death: Murdered
- Occupation: Machine operator
- Known for: Murder victim

On 14 December 1990, at Marsiling, Singapore, during a gang-related incident, a 20-year-old bystander and Malaysian citizen Sivapragasam a/l Subramaniam was struck on the head with an axe and he died as a result of the head injuries. It was revealed that the infamous gang Ang Soon Tong had entered the territory of their rival gang Gi Leng Hor (also spelt Gee Leng Hor), which happened to be in the same area where Sivapragasam was killed and had the intent to settle scores with the rival gang relating to prior conflicts. Sivapragasam was mistook for a rival gang member and therefore attacked; five other bystanders were also injured. A total of 14 suspects were arrested, and 13 of them were jailed for rioting and causing grievous hurt. The 14th and final suspect, Sagar Suppiah Retnam, who was the headman of Ang Soon Tong, was found guilty of murdering Sivapragasam and sentenced to death on 31 May 1994. Sagar's appeal was dismissed, and he was hanged on 7 July 1995.

== Marsiling gang attack ==
On the night of 14 December 1990, at Marsiling Drive, a group of armed men from the infamous gang Ang Soon Tong, which was active at Taman Jurong, attacked several people at different locations around a void deck of one of the HDB blocks in that area. It was revealed later through police investigations that the purpose of the Ang Soon Tong's attack was to wage a war with their rival gang Gi Leng Hor, who were active in that same area of Marsiling. However, none of the victims of the attack were members of any gang.

One of these victims, a 20-year-old Malaysian and machine operator named Sivapragasam Subramaniam, who came from Kuala Kangsar, Perak, died as a result of the head injuries he sustained. Another four people were injured and rushed to hospital; two of them - 18-year-old Mageswaran Ganapathy and 20-year-old Gabriel Shankar - were in critical condition while another two - 30-year-old Prakash Periasamy (a friend of Sivapragasam) and 18-year-old Mat Iqbal - were discharged in a few days. These four eventually survived. Another source revealed there was a sixth victim, Abu Bakar Mohd Ali (aged 18), who suffered from minor injuries due to the attack.

== Arrests ==
The police classified the death of Sivapragasam as murder, and they began to investigate the incident. It took about a month before the police managed to identify the suspects behind the case. A total of 13 suspects were arrested and charged with murder in the year 1991. The investigations showed that these 13 suspects were led by their Ang Soon Tong leader, Sagar Suppiah Retnam (alias Panjang), who masterminded the attack after they decided to go confront Gi Leng Hor for prior conflicts between their gang and Gi Leng Hor. Seven of these suspects were below the age of 18 at the time of the murder.

Sagar, who had escaped to Malaysia immediately after the murder, remained on the run for more than two years before his arrest in the Malaysian state of Johor in May 1992 for having a false passport and identification, and sentenced to ten months' imprisonment by a Johor court. After his release, Sagar was repatriated to Singapore on 8 September 1993, and he therefore became the 14th and final suspect to be apprehended and charged with murdering Sivapragasam. Sagar, a primary school drop-out and labourer, first joined the gang in 1984 and quickly rose through the ranks to become the gang's assistant chief in 1988. After another two years, Sagar became the new leader after their then previous leader Toh Poh Soon, alias Ah Soon, was arrested in August 1990, four months prior to the murder of Sivapragasam, and he had forty members under his wing. Sagar, who could speak fluent Hokkien but little English, was born as the fourth child and had three sisters and two brothers, and his mother was an employee of a mental hospital.

One of these 14 suspects, a 23-year-old Malaysian named Soosay Sinnappen, happened to be in custody since January 1991 after his arrest for the unrelated case of a transvestite's murder in Bugis on 27 October 1990. Therefore, just two weeks after he was first charged with murdering the 27-year-old transvestite Lim Yeow Chuan, Soosay faced another charge of murder for his alleged involvement in Sivapragasam's murder.

== Trial of the first 13 suspects ==
On 20 November 1992, the first eleven Ang Soon Tong members (all aged between 17 and 22) to stand trial all pleaded guilty to reduced charges of rioting, causing grievous hurt and being a member of an unlawful assembly. Three of them - 17-year-old James Bernard Raj Selvaraj, 17-year-old Prakash Rajamanickam and 17-year-old Surajanathan - were each sentenced to 31 months' jail; four of them - 20-year-old Brandon Gerard Morier, 19-year-old Silva Kumar Perumal, 20-year-old Shaik Abdul Kader Monnalebbai and 19-year-old Lee Thiam Soon (李添顺 Lǐ Tiānshùn; alias Li Tian Shun) - were each sentenced to four years' jail and three strokes of the cane; two of them - 19-year-old Nagentharan Raman and 22-year-old Moses Samuel Durairaj - were each given a 42-month jail term; 20-year-old Mahenthran Nundi was sentenced to four years' jail and four strokes of the cane, and finally, 19-year-old Kunasegaran Arumugam, who slashed an 18-year-old youth on the arm, received the heaviest sentence of five years' jail with eight strokes of the cane. Justice Punch Coomaraswamy, who heard the cases of the eleven youths, stated that this was a tragic case where it showed the tragic consequences of becoming a gang member and an innocent person died from the violence caused by the 14 perpetrators of the incident.

On 19 January 1993, the 12th member, 19-year-old Muthusamy Subramaniam, who was caught six months after the brutal killing, was sentenced to seven years in prison and given 17 strokes of the cane, after he pleaded guilty to causing grievous harm to Sivapragasam while armed with a parang, as well as being a member of an unlawful assembly.

Unlike the above 12 members, the 13th member, Soosay Sinnappen, was not tried for the murder of Sivapragasam, because he was separately facing trial with another man for the murder of a transvestite named Lim Yeow Chuan in October 1990. While Soosay's accomplice in that case was jailed and caned for robbery with hurt, Soosay was found guilty of murdering Lim and sentenced to death on 2 November 1992, just 18 days before the first trial of the Ang Soon Tong members. The death sentence for Lim's murder led to Soosay receiving a discharge not amounting to an acquittal for Sivapragasam's murder. Subsequently, Soosay successfully appealed to overturn his murder conviction, and his sentence was reduced to nine years' jail for a lesser offence of manslaughter on 10 August 1993. After Soosay's reprieve from the gallows, he was separately tried and convicted of a lower charge of either rioting or causing grievous hurt in relation to Sivapragasam's death, and hence Soosay was given a jail term of four years with six strokes of the cane.

After the conviction of his 13 co-accused for lesser charges, the mastermind, Sagar Suppiah Retnam, became the sole person who remained to be tried for murder.

== Trial of Sagar Suppiah Retnam ==
=== Trial hearing ===
Sagar Suppiah Retnam
- Sagar Suppiah Retnam, the headman of Ang Soon Tong and mastermind of the murder
- Born: Sagar s/o Suppiah Retnam c. 1967; Singapore
- Died: 7 July 1995 (aged 28); Changi Prison, Singapore
- Cause of death: Execution by hanging
- Other name: Panjang
- Occupation: Labourer
- Status: Executed
- Allegiance: Ang Soon Tong (former)
- Motive: To wage a war with rival gang Gi Leng Hor
- Conviction: Murder (one count)
- Criminal charges: Murder (one count)
- Penalty: Death by hanging

On 9 March 1994, Sagar Suppiah Retnam stood trial at the High Court for one count of murdering Sivapragasam Subramaniam four years prior. Ramesha Pillai represented Sagar as his defence counsel, and the prosecution was led by Lau Wing Yum of the Attorney-General's Chambers (AGC). The trial was presided by Judicial Commissioner Kan Ting Chiu of the High Court.

According to Sagar's confession, Sagar admitted that he led the gang to the Gi Leng Hor territory in Marsiling with an intent to attack the members of Gi Leng Hor, and they began to attack whoever they perceived to be the Gi Leng Hor members. He also admitted hitting Sivapragasam on the head without warning, after he and several members encountered Sivapragasam walking with his friend Prakash Periasamy after the both of them had supper in the nearby area. Sagar was purported to have used an axe to hit Sivapragasam on his head at least twice, while Prakash was stabbed on the abdomen by the other members who were present with Sagar at that time. This brutal attack led to 20-year-old Sivapragasam Subramaniam dying from excessive loss of blood from his head wounds.

During his trial, Sagar chose to not put up his defence and elected to remain silent. However, three of his fellow gang members were called as witnesses to testify for him. Soosay Sinnappen, who was then serving his sentence for killing a transvestite and causing violence during the Marsiling gang clash incident, as well as both Muthusami Subramaniam and Mahendran Nundi, testified that there was no intention to cause any death, and their common purpose was to settle their matters with Gi Leng Hor, rather than causing harm to anybody, a possibility not within their calculations. Sagar's defence counsel also sought to have Sagar's confession statement ruled as inadmissible, claiming it was made involuntarily.

=== Verdict ===
On 31 May 1994, after a trial lasting 13 days, Judicial Commissioner Kan Ting Chiu delivered his verdict.

In his judgement, Judicial Commissioner Kan stated that based on the evidence before him, and his interpretation of Sagar's decision to remain silent, he was satisfied that the elements to prove a murder charge against Sagar was made out beyond a reasonable doubt by the prosecution. Judicial Commissioner Kan noted that Sagar and his henchmen had the intent to go into rival gang territory to spark a gangland war on their rival gang and cause serious harm to whoever affiliated to them, as supported by their decision to bring weapons for the purpose of causing hurt, or at least with the knowledge that hurt may be caused. The judge also referred to Sagar's confession, in which he admitted to having used the axe to strike Sivapragasam on the head without warning, and since Sagar deliberately used the axe to attack Sivapragasam, such that the head injury caused during the axe attack was sufficient in the ordinary course of nature to cause death, Judicial Commissioner Kan determined that Sagar was liable for a conviction of murder under the law, regardless of whether he had the intent to kill or truly mistaken the victim as a rival gang member.

In conclusion, 27-year-old Sagar Suppiah Retnam was found guilty of murder, and sentenced to death. Under Section 302 of the Penal Code, the death penalty was mandatory for offenders guilty of murder within Singapore's jurisdiction. Sagar was reportedly calm and collected when Judicial Commissioner Kan pronounced the death sentence in court.

== Sagar's execution ==
While he was incarcerated on death row at Changi Prison, Sagar appealed against his murder conviction, but the appeal was dismissed by the Court of Appeal on 10 January 1995. The three Judges of Appeal Goh Joon Seng, L P Thean (Thean Lip Ping) and M Karthigesu unanimously held that the statements made by Sagar were given voluntarily, and that Sagar's decision to remain silent effectively waived himself an opportunity to explain the purpose of their arrival at Marsiling, and the trial judge was therefore correct to infer from Sagar's silence and other evidence that the gang had a motive of attacking the rival gang and causing hurt, and hence they upheld his murder conviction and death sentence. Subsequently, in a final bid to escape the gallows, Sagar petitioned for clemency to commute his death sentence to life imprisonment, and on 24 April 1995, however, then President Ong Teng Cheong rejected the clemency plea, therefore finalizing Sagar's death sentence.

On the Friday morning of 7 July 1995, Sagar Suppiah Retnam was hanged in Changi Prison at the age of 28. Two other people were also executed on the same date as Sagar: one of them was Goh Soon Huat, a 43-year-old jobless Singaporean caught trafficking 69.34g of heroin on 4 April 1994 and sentenced to death on 25 October 1994; the other was 30-year-old Anbuarsu Joseph, a former gang leader who was sentenced to death on 19 August 1994 for murdering 34-year-old operation assistant Thampusamy Murugian Gunasekaran back on 25 October 1993. Like Sagar, both Goh and Anbuarsu lost their appeals before they were put to death.

A year after Sagar's execution, Singaporean crime show Crimewatch re-enacted the murder of Sivapragasam and aired it on television in May 1996. The police also shared a message through this case that all people, especially youths, should not associate with or join any gangs and there would be tragic consequences arising from joining a gang.

== See also ==
- Caning in Singapore
- Capital punishment in Singapore
