= 1992–93 Singapore construction site murders =

Series of construction site robbery-murder cases in Singapore (1992–93)

1992–93 construction site murders
- Date: 18 November 1992 – 17 September 1993
- Location: Lim Chu Kang, Singapore (1992) Tampines, Singapore (1993)
- Outcome: Four sentenced to death for killing Chokalingam and Vallaisamy in January 1995; Three sentenced to death for Thaung's murder in March 1995; The five Thai convicts were put to death at Changi Prison on 15 March 1996
- Deaths: Thaung Schwee (42); Vallaisamy Aryian (31); Chokalingam Arumugam (22)
- Injuries: Rayappan Vedamuthu (26)
- Convicted: Prasong Bunsom (30); Prawit Yaowabutr (20); Panya Marmontree (21); Manit Wangjaisuk (29); Panya Amphawa (27)
- Verdict: Guilty
- Convictions: Gang robbery with murder under Section 396 of the Penal Code
- Sentence: Death

Between November 1992 and September 1993, at two locations within Singapore, a group of Thai migrant workers committed armed robberies at two construction sites located in Lim Chu Kang and Tampines respectively, which resulted in the deaths of three foreign construction workers, one Myanmar citizen in November 1992 and two Indian citizens in September 1993. Five of these assailants were eventually identified and arrested, and brought to trial for the robbery-murders. In two separate trials, all the five accused were found guilty of gang robbery with murder, and sentenced to death in early 1995. These five men were eventually hanged on 15 March 1996.

== 1992 Lim Chu Kang worksite murder ==
On 18 November 1992, at a construction site along Ama Keng Road in Lim Chu Kang, 42-year-old Myanmar national Thaung Schwee, also named U Thaung Schwee, was discovered dead with multiple injuries by his foreman. He was pronounced dead at Alexandra Hospital, after his colleagues brought him there for treatment. A changkol stick and spade were recovered from the scene, and they were mostly likely the murder weapons used to kill Thaung, whose case was classified as murder. Some survey equipment, which were worth S$20,000, were also stolen from the site, which gave rise to the theory that robbery was the possible motive for the murder.

On 2 April 1994, it was reported that a 30-year-old suspect, who was an illegal immigrant from Thailand, had been arrested as a suspect for the murder of Thaung; the suspect was one of the five Thai men allegedly responsible for the murder, and some of them also took part in another construction site murder that took place in September 1993. Similarly, in December 1993, a Thai citizen named Manit Wangjaisuk was publicly wanted by the police as a possible suspect for the murder of Thaung, as well as another murder of an Indian construction worker named Maruthamuthu Arivarasu in October 1993.

== 1993 Tampines worksite murders ==
On 17 September 1993, while they were sleeping at a construction site in Tampines, where the present-day campus of Temasek Polytechnic would be built, a group of three Indian construction workers were attacked by a robbery gang of seven Thai men, who assaulted them while they were armed with various weapons, and more than S$43,000 worth of equipment were stolen from the site itself. One of the three victims, 31-year-old Vallaisamy Aryian, was pronounced dead at the scene, while the remaining two victims - 22-year-old Chokalingam Arumugam and 26-year-old Rayappan Vedamuthu - were rushed to hospital for emergency treatment. However, upon his arrival at Tan Tock Seng Hospital, Chokalingam died from his injuries, and the third victim, Rayappan, survived with timely medical intervention after being hospitalized at Changi Hospital. Initially, the first-hand news coverage wrongly reported Chokalingam as the surviving victim and Rayappan as the second murder victim. This error was eventually corrected in subsequent news reports.

The double murders of Vallaisamy and Chokalingam were one of the ten or more cases of killings that happened at construction sites within a period of more than 15 months since October 1992; Thaung Schwee's death was the second reported case in the list itself, and the suspects of these cases, if not all, were believed to be foreigners. The investigation of the list of possible suspects were eventually narrowed down to the theory that a Thai gang was allegedly responsible for these cases, and there were evidence that the stolen survey equipment were being sold in Thailand (most of them) and other neighbouring countries. In February 1994, it was further reported that there were 18 Thai migrant workers arrested for overstaying, and they were also investigated on suspicion of having committed the murders.

== Tampines murder trial (1995) ==
By July 1994, the police managed to arrest four of the seven suspects (all of whom were Thai illegal immigrants) who were allegedly responsible for the murders of Vallaisamy and Chokalingam back in September 1993. The remaining three assailants, whose identities were unknown, remains at large till today. In October 1994, the four accused - 21-year-old Panya Marmontree, 20-year-old Prawit Yaowabutr, 29-year-old Manit Wangjaisuk, and 27-year-old Panya Amphawa - stood trial at the High Court for two charges of gang robbery with murder, which was framed under Section 396 of the Penal Code. This section, which differed from the typical murder offences that came under four clauses of Section 300 of the Penal Code, defined that if any one of five or more members of the group who commit gang robbery together, also commits murder, the potential punishment would be either the death sentence, or life imprisonment with caning of not less than 12 strokes. Murder, on the other hand, carried the mandatory death sentence under Section 302 of the Penal Code if convicted.

Justice Kan Ting Chiu was the presiding judge of the trial, and the prosecution was led by Bala Reddy. During the course of the trial, one of the defendants, Manit, was initially acquitted of the charges without having his defence being called, leading to the court proceedings being delayed. However, after the prosecution appealed, Manit's charges of gang robbery with murder were restored and he was brought back to court to give his defence. Out of the defendants, Panya Marmontree chose to remain silent, and the remaining three defendants testified on the stand and gave defences that they were not at the scene of the crime when the murders happened. Out of the four, Panya Marmontree and Prawit Yaowabutr were actually arrested for an unrelated case of committing burglary at a construction site in February 1994, before they were subsequently linked to the murders of Chokalingam and Vallaisamy and charged for the present offence.

On 16 January 1995, Justice Kan Ting Chiu delivered his verdict. He found that all the four accused and their three unidentified accomplices were present at the scene and had no doubt that they attacked the three Indian workers with a view to commit gang robbery and during the course of gang robbery, had caused the deaths of both Chokalingam and Vallaisamy. He also agreed with the prosecutors' submissions that the four men deserved to undergo the maximum punishment for the offence they were charged for. Therefore, the four men - Panya Marmontree, Prawit Yaowabutr, Manit Wangjaisuk, and Panya Amphawa - were found guilty of two counts of gang robbery with murder, and sentenced to death.

Afterwards, the four condemned appealed to the Court of Appeal against the trial decision. However, the appellate court upheld the trial ruling of their case and dismissed the appeals in August 1995. One of the appellate judges, Justice M Karthigesu, cited that the murders of Chokalingam and Vallaisamy were prime examples of gang robbery-cum-murders which "outraged the feelings of the community", because the evidence had clearly shown that the four appellants were armed with weapons with a view to cause potential serious injury or death, and their acts of violence were "mercilessly executed and gravely abhorrent in their execution", such that the maximum penalty of death was the only appropriate sentence that can be imposed for the appellants in their respective cases.

== Lim Chu Kang murder trial (1995) ==
On 25 January 1995, less than two weeks after they were both sentenced to hang for murdering Chokalingam Arumugam and Vallaisamy Aryian, both Manit Wangjaisuk and Panya Amphawa, who were found to be responsible for the robbery-murder of Thaung Schwee back in November 1992, were brought back to court for a second trial. The duo's third accomplice Prasong Bunsom (aged 30 in 1994), who never participated in the 1993 Tampines case, was jointly tried with the two men for killing Thaung. All three of them faced the same charge of gang robbery with murder under Section 396 of the Penal Code, similar to the charges which Manit and Panya were convicted for in the 1993 Tampines case. Wong Keen Onn was the trial prosecutor of the case, and Justice T S Sinnathuray was appointed as the presiding judge of the trio's trial. At that point, the trio's final two accomplices were unidentified and not yet apprehended for the crime.

The court was told that Khin Maung Oo, Thaung's compatriot and colleague who discovered the body, had just left the scene minutes before the murder itself, and when he returned, he discovered his friend's body and thus reported the matter. Khin was said to have witnessed a van, which was revealed to be driven by the defendants and their missing accomplices, present at the scene before the murder, and the van disappeared after Thaung's death was discovered. Fingerprints lifted at the scene were also matched to those belonging to both Prasong and Manit; all three accused denied having killed Thaung, even though they only partially admitted to participating in only robbery and denied having fatally assaulted Thaung.

On 2 March 1995, Justice T S Sinnathuray delivered his verdict. In his judgement, Justice Sinnathuray found that the prosecution had proven their case against the trio beyond a reasonable doubt, and having noted that the crime was committed in an extremely brutal and violent manner, and cited that there were an increasing trend of murders happening at construction sites throughout the past three years or so, Justice Sinnathuray believed that the maximum punishment should be imposed to show the abhorrence and condemnation of the court and public for such crimes. Therefore, the three men - Manit Wangjaisuk, Panya Amphawa, and Prasong Bunsom - were found guilty of murdering Thaung during the course of gang robbery, and sentenced to death. This verdict marked the second time Manit and Panya received the death sentence for the same offence in a separate case.

Manit, Panya and Prasong later appealed against their convictions and sentences, but the Court of Appeal rejected their appeals in August 1995. Chief Justice Yong Pung How, who was one of the three judges hearing the appeals, stated that as long as there was a murder committed by at least one out of the five or more participants during a gang robbery, there was no need to prove that every one of the perpetrators had the intent to cause death, based on the definition of gang robbery with murder under Section 396 of the Penal Code.

== Executions of the five killers ==
In early 1996, the death warrant of all the five condemned Thai men was finalized, and their execution date was set on 15 March 1996. On 8 March 1996, a week before the five men were due to hang, the Thai government's appeal for clemency was rejected by then President of Singapore Ong Teng Cheong. A Thai radio station, out of kindness, raised a sum of around 10,000 Thai baht to help the families of the five Thai convicts to travel to Singapore to see their sons one last time in jail. The father of one of the convicts also told the press that he had no money to cremate his son's body and arrange for the ashes to be returned to Thailand, and his wish was to see his son one last time before he was executed.

On 15 March 1996, the five Thai workers - Panya Marmontree, Prawit Yaowabutr, Manit Wangjaisuk, Panya Amphawa, and Prasong Bunsom - were hanged in Changi Prison at dawn. Shortly after the hangings, police spokesperson confirmed to the media that the five men had been put to death for the three murders they were convicted for, and cited that the five were part of a gang robbery group who had committed various other robberies at construction sites all over Singapore. The five men's corpses were recovered by their families, and they were cremated before the ashes were brought back to Thailand under the arrangements of the Thai government.

== Aftermath ==
Amnesty International, an international human rights group, condemned the Singaporean government for executing the five Thai workers despite the clemency plea from Thailand, and they stated that the death penalty was an "ultimate cruel, inhuman and degrading punishment", and would continue to push for Singapore to abolish the death penalty altogether.

However, in contrast, the Thai government had a "calm and collected" response to the executions, and they stated that they respected the Singaporean judiciary and the decision to hang the five Thai citizens for the construction site murders, and found there was no miscarriage of justice. Many Thai politicians also acknowledged that they had done their best to seek clemency for the five men, and they urged their citizens to abide by the laws of whichever country they live, study and work in. The Thai government's response was noted to be a contradiction to the sensational media coverage of the execution of Flor Contemplacion, a Filipino maid who was found guilty of murdering a maid and a four-year-old boy; Contemplacion's execution in March 1995 became an international controversy and had evolved into a diplomatic issue between Singapore and the Philippines due to allegations that Contemplacion was innocent of the double murder, even though Contemplacion had confessed to the crime and never once proclaimed her innocence. The Singapore government also stated that the law of Singapore treated everyone equally and fairly, regardless of their nationality, and the Thai government's response was a good example of respect for other countries' laws and judicial system.

The executions of the five Thai construction site murderers were briefly mentioned in a real-life crime book titled Talking with Serial Killers: A Chilling Study of the World's Most Evil People, written by criminologist Christopher Berry-Dee and first published in 2023. The executions were mentioned in the chapter covering John Martin Scripps, a British serial killer who was executed for murdering a South African tourist in a hotel in Singapore, and their cases were mentioned to show the impartiality of the judicial system in Singapore, which emphasized that regardless of a criminal's nationality, he or she would be subjected to equal and fair punishment under the law.

In January 2015, the 1995 appeal case of the four men - Panya Marmontree, Prawit Yaowabutr, Manit Wangjaisuk, and Panya Amphawa - against their convictions for killing Chokalingam Arumugam and Vallaisamy Aryian was referenced to by the Court of Appeal in a landmark ruling of a murder case that coined the sentencing guidelines for unpremeditated murder in Singapore. The Court of Appeal, having reviewed the prosecution's appeal against the re-sentencing of Malaysian convicted murderer Kho Jabing, whose original death sentence for murdering a Chinese construction worker was commuted to life imprisonment and 24 strokes of the cane, after a 2013 law was passed to allow offenders to receive either a life term or death for crimes of murder without any intention to kill. After reviewing the Thais' appeal case and some other precedent cases, the Court of Appeal ruled that the death penalty, as the maximum punishment for murder, should be imposed in cases that demonstrated an offender's cruelty and/or a blatant disregard for human life, and also sparked an outrage of the community's feelings. Kho was therefore sentenced to hang by a majority decision of three to two, after the majority of judges were satisfied that he should be executed based on the new sentencing guidelines; Kho was eventually put to death on 20 May 2016 after failing to overturn his sentence one final time.

== See also ==
- Capital punishment in Singapore
