= Rozman Jusoh =

Malaysian hanged in Singapore for drug trafficking in 1996

Rozman bin Jusoh
- 1993 police mugshot of Rozman bin Jusoh
- Born: Rozman bin Jusoh; 1 January 1971; Kampung Semerak, Pasir Mas, Kelantan, Malaysia
- Died: 12 April 1996 (aged 25); Changi Prison, Singapore
- Cause of death: Execution by hanging
- Occupation: Odd-job labourer
- Parent: Minah Jusoh (mother)
- Status: Executed
- Conviction: Drug trafficking (two counts)
- Criminal charge: 1st charge: Trafficking of 1.04kg of marijuana 2nd charge: Trafficking of 943.3g of marijuana
- Penalty: Death penalty (×2)

Rozman bin Jusoh (1 January 1971 – 12 April 1996) was a Malaysian convicted drug trafficker. He and his childhood friend Razali bin Mat Zin were both arrested in Singapore for two separate charges of trafficking 1.04 kg of marijuana (or cannabis) and 943.3g of the same substance, as a result of an undercover operation facilitated by the Central Narcotics Bureau (CNB). It was decreed by Singapore law that trafficking 500g of marijuana or more was punishable by death.

During Rozman's trial, where he was jointly tried with Razali for the same charges, Rozman was assessed to have a sub-normal IQ of 74 and easily prone to manipulation, and it was argued by his lawyers that Rozman should not be held fully culpable for capital drug trafficking given that he was approached by an undercover officer to make a deal to sell the drugs to him and the evidence obtained by entrapment cannot be used against him.

Initially, Rozman was sentenced to a seven-year term of imprisonment for two reduced charges of drug possession in March 1995, but the prosecution's appeal in August 1995 led to Rozman being sentenced to death for the original charges and he was eventually executed on 12 April 1996. As for Rozman's accomplice Razali, he was acquitted of all charges at the end of his trial before he was sentenced to be hanged upon the prosecution's appeal.

== Biography ==
Born in 1971 at the Malaysian state of Kelantan, Rozman bin Jusoh grew up with one eldest brother and four other siblings in an ethnic Malay family living at Kampung Semerak, Pasir Mas. His father worked as a farmer while his mother worked as a traditional masseuse. He had a childhood friend named Razali bin Mat Zin, who went to Singapore to work since age 13.

Rozman studied up to Form Three, the third year of secondary school by Malaysian educational standards. After that, he went to Singapore for an unspecified year to work as a labourer. He was considered to have a below-average intellectual ability, which often caused his mother concern about his future and education.

== Drug charges and trial ==
=== Arrest ===
On 25 November 1993, 22-year-old Rozman bin Jusoh was arrested for marijuana (or cannabis) trafficking. A day earlier, Rozman met up with an undercover officer from the Central Narcotics Bureau (CNB). The officer, Tan Keng Ann, was ordered to arrange the meet-up with Rozman after the narcotics police received a tip-off on 23 November that a man was selling marijuana at a shopping mall at Upper Bukit Timah. Tan pretended to be a buyer interested in purchasing marijuana from Rozman, who agreed to sell him the drugs the next day over a negotiated payment of S$1,800.

The next day, with the help of Razali, who escorted him on a motorcycle, Rozman arrived at the KFC fried chicken restaurant at an Upper Bukit Timah shopping centre, and meet up with Tan as per the arranged timing. It was at that location where Rozman was ambushed by narcotics officers who were on prior standby. A total of 1.04 kg of marijuana, which had a street worth of S$1,800, was found in Rozman's possession. Soon after Rozman's arrest, Razali was also arrested for the crime, and a search on his motorcycle revealed another package of drugs, which contained 943.3g of marijuana.

On 28 November 1993, both Rozman and Razali were charged with two counts of trafficking marijuana, one for 1.04 kg and another for 943.3g respectively. Under the Misuse of Drugs Act, if the amount of marijuana trafficked exceeded the capital threshold of 500g, the trafficker would face the mandatory death penalty if convicted.

Tan Keng Ann, the undercover cop who contributed to the capture of Rozman, won commendations from the CNB. However, 29-year-old Tan died in June 1996 due to his 24-year-old fiancée Cheng Jun, an immigrant from China, shooting him accidentally without knowing her fiancé's gun was actually loaded. Cheng, who was originally charged with murder, was jailed for sixteen months for a reduced charge of causing death by a rash act.

=== Trial ===
The joint trial of both Rozman bin Jusoh and Razali bin Mat Zin was conducted at the High Court on 3 October 1994, with the trial judge M P H Rubin hearing the case.

During his trial, a psychiatric report revealed that Rozman's IQ was 74, which was below the average normal IQ of 90, and was categorized as subnormal and borderline intelligence. It was further revealed that Rozman may be easily prone to manipulation of others, which could have affected him into selling the drugs to the undercover officer Tan Keng Ann. From this evidence, Rozman's lawyer Mohamed Muzammil Mohamed argued that Rozman should not be held fully culpable for the two charges of capital drug trafficking, given that he was approached by officers in the first place to smuggle and sell drugs, and he was being persuaded to do so as per his tendency to be easily directed by others to do something he may or may not fully intend to. He also argued that it would be unsafe to convict Rozman based on the entrapment evidence against him. In rebuttal, the trial prosecutor Chong Chee Hong argued that Rozman was able to discern the difference of right and wrong and was fully aware of the magnitude of his actions despite the intelligence issue of Rozman's case.

Razali, on the other hand, totally denied any involvement in the crime despite the prosecution's assertion and evidence that he was a willing and intentional participant of Rozman's crime. Razali stated that he only rode the motorcycle that day to escort Rozman to the fried chicken restaurant out of goodwill for his childhood friend and fellow villager from Kelantan, and was unfortunately implicated by Rozman's individual actions of smuggling the marijuana to sell.

=== Verdict ===
On 7 March 1995, Justice M P H Rubin delivered his verdict.

In his judgement, Justice Rubin accepted the defence's evidence that Rozman indeed had subnormal intelligence and it sufficiently impaired him to the point of being easily prone to manipulation by others and mental responsibility for the crime, and that he was indeed coerced into selling drugs by the narcotics police's efforts for their purpose to detect and arrest suspected drug smugglers. Justice Rubin also stated that based on these factors, which he viewed as unopposed by the prosecution, as well as the entrapment evidence obtained from the undercover operation, it would be unsafe to convict Rozman of these two charges of drug trafficking and subject him to the mandatory sentence of death. Despite so, Justice stressed that the narcotics police did not have any wrongdoing when arresting Rozman and conducting the necessary operations to nab possible traffickers, and he commented that it was merely an "unfortunate" case where a drug trafficker they caught happened to be intellectually subnormal. The judge also accepted the second defendant Razali's evidence that he only wanted to give a ride to his childhood friend Rozman and never knew about the presence of marijuana in his possession during the whole time he was with Rozman and while escorting him on his motorcycle.

Extracted from Justice Rubin's judgement in Public Prosecutor v. Rozman bin Jusoh and Another, [1994] SGHC 251:

"It was… clear from the evidence that the CNB agent and the undercover CNB officer were more than mere agents, and had, in fact, undertaken a substantially active role in persuading [Rozman] to sell them drugs… [Rozman] was a person without guile and would not have embarked upon this expedition for a mere $100 if not for his feeble mind which seemed to have been overborne by the CNB agent and the CNB operative… There was a grave doubt raised as to whether he could be criminally responsible to warrant the mandatory death sentence, in light of his intellectual disability and the real possibility of being manipulated."

As such, 24-year-old Rozman bin Jusoh was convicted of two reduced charges of drug possession and sentenced to two concurrent sentences of seven years' imprisonment (one for each charge). 28-year-old Razali bin Mat Zin was fully acquitted of both charges, although he still remained in remand pending the prosecution's appeal against the trial decision. Rozman's case was the first where a drug trafficker escaped the gallows in Singapore on the grounds of an intellectual disability.

== Prosecution's appeal ==
=== Appeal hearing ===
On 23 May 1995, while Rozman was serving his seven-year jail term at Changi Prison, the prosecution's appeal was heard at the Court of Appeal, the highest court of the nation. The appeal was heard by three judges - Chief Justice Yong Pung How and two Judges of Appeal Thean Lip Ping (L P Thean) and M Karthigesu. The prosecution argued that despite having subnormal IQ, Rozman was adept and coherent in his daily functioning and dealings with the undercover officer, and was a willing and active participant into smuggling and selling drugs, and they argued that Rozman was able to understand the magnitude of his actions, and the trial judge had erred in considering Rozman's intelligence as a factor to discount his responsibility for the original drug charges. The prosecution also argued in the same appeal that Razali should not be acquitted given that evidence showed that he clearly knew that he was carrying drugs and had been actively participating in the smuggling of drugs. The judgement was reserved after the court heard the arguments.

=== Death penalty ===
On 14 August 1995, the Court of Appeal delivered its judgement, with Justice Thean pronouncing the verdict in court.

Although the three-judge panel acknowledged that Rozman indeed had subnormal intelligence, they pointed out that the factors of his intelligence and mental state cannot be used as a defence against the capital drug charge under the law, and they found that such mitigating factors were not relevant to decide on the appropriate sentence for Rozman, given that the death penalty was mandatory for the amount smuggled by Rozman (which exceeded the capital threshold) and the judges had no discretion to sentence Rozman to any other punishment aside from death for the original charge. They also judged that based on the evidence itself, Rozman's low intellect did not affect his daily functioning or detract from his intention to smuggle the drugs in the first place and the narcotics officers did not manipulate Rozman to sell the drugs to the undercover officer, given that entrapment evidence did not amount to manipulation to convince a suspect to commit a crime.

Therefore, the three-judge panel allowed the prosecution's appeal, and found 24-year-old Rozman bin Jusoh guilty of the two original drug charges. Consequently, Rozman's seven-year sentence was increased to the death penalty for each count by the Court of Appeal. Simultaneously, 28-year-old Razali bin Mat Zin's acquittal was also overturned, and he was therefore convicted of the original charges and sentenced to death as well, given that the three-judge panel agreed that Razali was indeed involved in the crime based on Rozman's evidence against him.

=== Reactions to appeal verdict ===
The families of Rozman and Razali were saddened at the Court of Appeal's decision to sentence both men to death. Razali's elderly mother Selemah binti Jusoh, who travelled from their native Kamping Semeruk to hear the verdict, stated that she originally went there with the hope to bring Razali, who was her eldest son, home but she was filled with heartbreak about the verdict of death. 53-year-old Selemah, who lived together with Razali, his wife and the couple's then 19-month-old son Faizal, stated that her son originally planned to remain in Singapore to earn enough money to buy a house and had been working in Singapore since age 13, but never expected him to commit a crime. Rozman's 56-year-old mother Minah Jusoh, who received the news through a phone call to her eldest son's house at Kelantan, was devastated to hear about the verdict and described her initial shock about Rozman smuggling drugs to get rich quickly, and thought she and her family would get to see Rozman and had plans to bring him to religious classes to steer him back on the right track once he was released from prison.

== Execution ==
On 12 April 1996, 25-year-old Rozman bin Jusoh was hanged in Changi Prison at dawn. At the same timing, Rozman's 29-year-old accomplice Razali bin Mat Zin and a 35-year-old Singaporean hawker assistant Neo Kay Liang (convicted of trafficking 20.19g of heroin) also executed at the same prison. Since the 1975 introduction of capital punishment for drug trafficking, more than 130 people, including Rozman, Razali and Neo, were put to death for drug offences.

== Aftermath ==
The case of Rozman bin Jusoh was constantly recalled over the next decades even after he was hung in 1996. Amnesty International revealed in 2004 that Singapore had authorized more than 400 executions between 1991 and 2004, most for drug trafficking, and issued criticisms to Singapore for concentrating the imposition of the death penalty for many offenders who came from disadvantaged backgrounds like the poor, uneducated and foreigners, and Rozman's case was cited as one of these cases that highlighted the supposed unfairness of the death penalty for convicts originating from such groups in Singapore. In response, the Singapore government argued that the death penalty was necessary for drugs and had been an effective deterrent which made possible for Singapore earning its reputation as one of the safest countries in the world, and denied that the capital punishment was discriminatory to people from disadvantaged backgrounds. They also stated that by deploying the death penalty to protect its residents from the harmful effect of drugs, Singapore was protecting the human rights and welfare of its residents.

Similarly, in 2010, opposition newspaper The Online Citizen also criticized the 1995 court decision to sentence Rozman to death and touched on the lack of discretion and judicial mercy for the judges to decide the appropriate punishment for drug trafficking in Singapore, given that Rozman was sent to the gallows despite his intellectual disability.

The case of Rozman was recalled again in light of the 2012 governmental proposals to amend Singapore's drug laws and remove the mandatory death sentence for certain offences of murder and drug trafficking. It was cited among the discussions about the possible impacts that may come with the discretion to decide on the sentence for drug traffickers with low intelligence, which may have allowed their lives be spared. Sylvia Lim, an opposition politician and member of Workers' Party, also cited Rozman's case in her parliamentary debate about the need to spare certain offenders from the gallows based on their mitigating factors, which were not considered in Rozman's case due to Singapore's mandatory imposition of capital punishment for drugs. In the aftermath, the new laws took effect in January 2013, and it allowed the imposition of life imprisonment (with or without caning) for drug traffickers who either only acted as couriers or suffered from disabilities that impaired their mental responsibility for the crime, as well as for murderers who had no substantial intention to cause death.

Rozman's case was recalled in November 2021 when Singapore faced international attention for controversially scheduling the execution of Nagaenthran K. Dharmalingam, a Malaysian who allegedly had borderline intelligence and mental disabilities. The Singapore government, courts and psychiatrists had expressed that Nagaenthran was not intellectually or mentally disabled when he committed the crime of smuggling 42.72 grams of diamorphine. Nagaenthran, whose original date of execution was postponed due to an appeal, was subsequently hanged on 27 April 2022.

A book titled Drugs Law and Legal Practice in Southeast Asia: Indonesia, Singapore and Vietnam, which was written about Asian countries' drug laws, was published in 2016. Rozman's case was cited as one of the notable cases in Singapore that raised the implications of sentencing offenders to death in the face of entrapment evidence and their mental disabilities. Alan Shadrake, a British journalist, wrote about Rozman's case in his book Once A Jolly Hangman: Singapore Justice in the Dock, which was first published in 2010. However, as the book contained severe inaccuracies and false allegations about Singapore's judicial system, Shadrake was arrested in July 2010 by the Singapore authorities upon entering Singapore for his upcoming book promotion event, and later sentenced to a S$20,000 fine and six weeks' imprisonment (later increased to eight weeks due to his failure to pay the fine) for contempt of court. Shadrake, who refused to show remorse for his crime, lost his appeal and later released by parole on 9 July 2011 after serving two-thirds of his sentence with good behaviour.

== See also ==
- Misuse of Drugs Act (Singapore)
- Capital punishment in Singapore
- Execution of Nagaenthran K. Dharmalingam
