= Killing of Ramapiram Kannickaisparry =

1995 unsolved killing of an Indian-Singaporean woman

Ramapiram Kannickaisparry
- Born: Ramapiram Kannickaisparry; 1956; India
- Died: 17 April 1995 (aged 39); Sembawang, Singapore
- Cause of death: Murdered by stabbing and vehicle collision
- Resting place: A Hindu cemetery in Singapore
- Other names: Ramipiram Kannickaisparry
- Occupation: Production operator
- Employer: Apple (Singapore branch)
- Known for: Murder victim
- Spouse: Munisamy Pandian (m. 1973–her death. 1995)
- Children: Two sons

Ramapiram Kannickaisparry (c. 1956 – 17 April 1995), also known as Ramipiram Kannickaisparry, was an Indian-born Singaporean woman who was found dead in a forested area of Sembawang on 17 April 1995. Ramapiram was last seen alive six hours before her corpse was discovered, with thirteen stab wounds on her head and neck, and her body showed signs of being run over by a vehicle. The police classified the case of her death as murder, and three days later, a 40-year-old man named Nadasan Chandra Secharan, who was the younger brother of Ramapiram's brother-in-law, was arrested and charged with her murder. Investigations and court proceedings revealed that Ramapiram and Nadasan were engaged in an illicit love affair with each other, even though both were married to different spouses and had children.

Nadasan was tried by the High Court and sentenced to death after being found guilty of murder, but the Court of Appeal heard Nadasan's case and decided to acquit Nadasan and release him due to lack of concrete evidence to substantiate the murder charge against Nadasan. As of today, the death of Ramapiram remains unsolved and the murderer(s) were never caught.

== Death and police investigations ==
On the evening of 17 April 1995 at 6 pm, 38-year-old Soh Jin Chwee was jogging along the forest of Ulu Sembawang when he discovered the body of a woman lying in the undergrowth. Due to great shock, Soh did not immediately report the finding and instead, he told his brother about the gruesome discovery. The police were contacted the next day by Soh's brother, and subsequently, an autopsy report by forensic pathologist Dr Paul Chui revealed that the woman had thirteen stab wounds on her head and neck, and also sustained broken ribs and pelvis, which showed that she could be run over by a vehicle.

The woman was identified as 39-year-old production operator Ramapiram Kannickaisparry, who was married to an army officer Munisamy Pandian, with whom she had two sons. She was separated from her husband at the time she was killed. She was last seen alive at 12.15 pm at her workplace Apple Computer, six hours before Soh's discovery of her death and her corpse. Several tyre marks were found on the wet mud near the corpse. The police investigations were led by Inspector Richard Lim Beng Gee, who was known for cracking several high-profile cases (which included the Anthony Ler case, Oriental Hotel murder, Bulgarian lady murder and the Koh Ngiap Yong murder case).

Three days later, the police arrested a suspect, who was a 40-year-old mechanic named Nadasan Chandra Secharan, the younger brother of Ramapiram's brother-in-law, outside his Yishun flat. Nadasan was married with three children and worked as a mechanic at the Seletar Country Club at the time of his arrest. Prior to his arrest, both Nadasan and Ramapiram were engaged in an affair after they first met each other in 1991 at a family gathering in his brother's house, and Ramapiram's husband got wind of the affair some time after it started, which caused them to live in separation. Nadasan was charged with murder on 22 April 1995, two days after his arrest.

A broken tooth was found inside Nadasan's van, in addition to some gold items and jewellery, which were purportedly belonging to the deceased victim. By the time the tooth was found, the body of Ramapiram was returned to her bereaved family and cremated, hence it cannot be compared if it belonged to her. As there were no DNA experts in Singapore at the time, the tooth was thus sent to the forensic experts of Scotland Yard in Britain for DNA testing. After some testing, it was confirmed to belong to Ramapiram.

Background information of Nadasan revealed that he first began working as a mechanic at the British Naval Base in 1974, before he switched to becoming a mechanic at Singapore Bus Service (SBS), before he left SBS two years later and joined the New Zealand Naval Base. Nadasan was retrenched in 1989 and switched to self-employment in 1992, before he went on to become a mechanic at the Seletar Country Club, a job which he held until his arrest for allegedly murdering Ramapiram.

== Trial of Nadasan Chandra Secharan ==
=== Prosecution's case ===
On 11 January 1996, Nadasan Chandra Secharan stood trial for the murder of Ramapiram Kannickaisparry in the High Court, with the case being heard by the High Court's judge Lai Kew Chai (who notably sentenced both serial killer Sek Kim Wah and child killer Took Leng How to death in 1985 and 2005 respectively). Deputy Public Prosecutors (DPPs) Ong Hian Sun and Kan Shuk Weng of the Attorney-General's Chambers (AGC) were in charge of prosecuting Nadasan, while Nadasan was represented by Subhas Anandan, then the most famous criminal lawyer in Singapore, and Amolat Singh was the second lawyer to assist Subhas in court defending Nadasan. Subhas revealed later in his book that he and Nadasan were acquaintances and seen each other regularly at the Hindu temple they worshipped.

The prosecution's case was that Nadasan killed Ramapiram due to the latter wanting to end the affair between them. They argued that Nadasan used the van to knock over Ramapiram after stabbing her inside the van, which led to the tooth being broken and fell off. They also consulted Dr Anthony Boyd Gummer, a forensic expert from New Zealand, who compared the tyre marks to Nadasan's van and concluded that the tyre marks belonged to Nadasan's van.

=== Defence's case ===
The defence, however, rebutted the facts of the prosecution's case, and argued that Nadasan was not involved in the crime.

Subhas cross-examined the Scotland Yard DNA expert Dr Valerie Susan Tomlinson, and he extracted the female expert's admission that the sample was contaminated, and the proper protocols were not followed while testing the broken tooth. Subhas also cross-examined the New Zealander expert Dr Gummer, who confirmed his findings of the tyre marks were only made after referring to the photos of the crime scene and the van, as well as there were only one in 133 probabilities that they belonged to Nadasan's van. Subhas also invited an Australian DNA expert Colin Wingrove and Australian forensic expert Brian Leslie McDonald, who both rebutted the evidence of the British DNA expert and New Zealander forensic expert respectively. Subhas also argued that the tooth could have broken off due to Ramapiram's habit of using her teeth to open beer bottle caps, a habit which Ramapiram's husband Munisamy told the court about when he appeared as a witness. This possibility was given some credence with Nadasan's recount that he often ate food and drank beer with Ramapiram behind his van during the happier moments of their four years together up until her murder.

Nadasan, who denied killing Ramapiram, took the stand to give his account of what happened. He stated he, at the time when Ramapiram was last seen alive, was repairing his van somewhere else and was not at the scene of crime. He stated that it was lunchtime, and since his home at Yishun was not far from the Seletar Country Club, he drove home to have his lunch. It happened that on the way, Nadasan's twenty-year-old van broke down as it usually did a few previous occasions, causing him to stop to fix the van, and the heavy downpour of rain during his lunchtime further delayed him, which led to him taking about one hour to fix the van. Nadasan's employer confirmed he paged Nadasan, who called him to inform him that he was repairing his van. Having taken quite some time to repair the van, Nadasan explained he skipped lunch and returned to his workplace.

Yet, after Nadasan completed his testimony on the stand, the prosecution called on a Grade One mechanic, who did not have a prior understanding of Nadasan's van, to testify that fixing the van should have taken only twenty minutes. Having cross-examined the mechanic, Subhas urged the court to not consider the mechanic's testimony since the witness did not have a prior understanding of his client's van and it was reasonable to take one hour to repair his van, given Nadasan's poor mechanic skills, the heavy rain and it was his lunchtime. He also argued that Nadasan behaved normally throughout the day at his house and workplace, and it was not the expected post-killing behaviour of someone who just committed a brutal murder, and said if indeed he was guilty, Nadasan would be the "coolest cucumber in the world".

=== Sentencing verdict ===
On 24 June 1996, the trial judge Lai Kew Chai delivered his verdict.

In his judgement, Justice Lai stated he did not believe Nadasan's defence of using more than one hour to repair the van, and disbelieved that his van would coincidentally break down at another place at the time of murder. He stated that despite the flawed points, the prosecution's evidence was more persuasive than the defence in proving Nadasan guilty of murder rather than not guilty. The judge stated that with the DNA tests and forensic examination of the tyre marks, as well as the probable motive Nadasan had to cause Ramapiram's death, he concluded the prosecution had proven its case beyond a reasonable doubt and thus found 40-year-old Nadasan Chandra Secharan guilty of the murder of 39-year-old Ramapiram Kannickaisparry.

In accordance to Singapore law, Justice Lai imposed the death penalty on Nadasan after his conviction, since all degrees of murder offences in Singapore back then carried the mandatory punishment of death (up until 2013 when life imprisonment was introduced as Singapore's lowest penalty for murder offences with no intention to kill).

According to Subhas Anandan, he was disappointed with the verdict and Nadasan's family were emotionally distraught at the verdict of death. Nadasan also expressed his intention to appeal against the murder conviction. The aftermath of Nadasan's trial also led to Singapore deciding to adopt better technology to help facilitate better-quality forensic and DNA examinations.

A March 1998 article from the national newspaper The Straits Times revealed that the total cost of Nadasan's trial amounted to S$100,000.

== Nadasan's appeal and acquittal ==
On 20 November 1996, the Court of Appeal heard the appeal of Nadasan Chandra Secharan and delivered its verdict on 14 January 1997.

Having carefully scrutinized the case, the Court of Appeal found it was unacceptable to rely on the testimony of the Grade One mechanic whom the prosecution called upon, as based on Nadasan's mechanic skills, he himself was not a Grade One mechanic and he was also unable to spend a short period of twenty minutes to fix the van, and at the time he was fixing the van, it was raining and it happened to be Nadasan's lunchtime, and since he was not in a hurry, they accepted that Nadasan took more than one hour to repair the van. They also found that this particular witness did not have a prior understanding of the state of Nadasan's van before giving his testimony, hence they rejected his testimony.

The three judges - consisting of Chief Justice Yong Pung How, and two Judges of Appeal L P Thean and M Karthigesu - also rejected the evidence of the prosecution's New Zealander expert, as the results clearly showed that there was only a probability of one in 133 that the tyre marks belonged to Nadasan's van. Given that there was a low possibility that the tyre marks came from Nadasan's van, the three judges found that the results were not rigorous enough to show that they were definitely of Nadasan’s vehicle and hence concluded that this part of evidence cannot be relied on as well to convict Nadasan of murder.

The Court of Appeal also noted that although the DNA tests on the broken tooth had indeed proven that it belonged to Ramapiram, they pointed out that the tooth had more than one person's DNA profile and was contaminated, which raise doubts over the validity of the DNA results, and the broken tooth cannot be conclusively matched to the deceased Ramapiram's teeth since the corpse was cremated before the discovery of the tooth in the back of Nadasan's van. Also, even if the tooth was indeed Ramapiram's, there was no evidence to show that the tooth broke off as a result of a collision by Nadasan's van, and since the van and Nadasan's clothes and tools (which were all washed) had no traces of the victim's DNA, human tissue or blood, it was unlikely that Nadasan was responsible for the murder. Besides, the tooth could have broke off some months before the murder, and the testimonies of Ramapiram's family members showed that Ramapiram had a habit of using her teeth to open beer bottles, and Nadasan explained that he often ate and drank with Ramapiram at the back of the van during their past moments together. These above explanations lent credence to the theory that Ramapiram herself broke her tooth when opening beer bottles a long time prior to her death.

The Court of Appeal determined that the gold items found inside Nadasan's van might not belong to Ramapiram, since they were common gold items and they could have been lost by other people, and Nadasan used the van to fetch wedding guests on several occasions. The Court of Appeal also agreed that it was a coincidence that the van broke down on the day of the murder, and it was not surprising at all given the van was about twenty years old and it was not in a good condition. The six hours from the time when Ramapiram was last seen alive until the time she was discovered dead was considered long enough to allow the possibility of someone else being responsible for murdering Ramapiram. The three judges also criticized the prosecution for their weak case, as well as the trial judge Lai Kew Chai for his weak judgement and lack of precise consideration in reaching the verdict.

As such, the Court of Appeal unanimously found Nadasan not guilty of murder, and they granted him an acquittal. This led to Nadasan's death sentence revoked and his conviction overturned, and hence, Nadasan was released from Changi Prison on the same date his appeal was allowed.

The appeal ruling was widely reported in the media, because it was extremely rare in Singapore for the Court of Appeal, the highest court of the nation, to acquit convicted killers of murder and dismissing their death sentences. According to Nadasan's lawyer Subhas Anandan, his client cried openly in court and shed tears of relief and happiness when the Court of Appeal allowed his appeal.

It was also reported that Ramapiram's husband was extremely shocked at the Court of Appeal's decision to acquit Nadasan, because he kept considering Nadasan guilty of his wife's killing, and even at the very least, expected Nadasan to be sentenced to life imprisonment if he was guilty of manslaughter. However, he expressed he would move on with his life and continue raising his two sons, then aged 12 and 23 respectively. After receiving news about Nadasan's appeal while in India, Ramapiram's mother, who also had six more children in addition to Ramapiram, was stunned about the ruling but stated she hoped to know the truth and who really killed her daughter, whose death she and the rest of the family kept secret from Ramapiram's father, who had a chronic heart condition.

Aside from this, the Court of Appeal also stated that there was a need for measures to safeguard the statistic evidence during court proceedings.

== Aftermath ==
=== Later life of Nadasan ===
On the same day of his acquittal and release, Nadasan Chandra Secharan returned to his home in Yishun, and he reunited with his three children and wife, the latter who had long forgiven him for the affair. Several siblings and relatives of Nadasan from Singapore, India and Malaysia were also present. Nadasan was also allowed to go back to the Seletar Country Club to resume his original job as a mechanic, and he decided to move on with his life after putting the horrors of receiving the death sentence and affair behind him. According to his former lawyer Subhas Anandan, who maintained regular contact with him and occasionally met him at the temple (up until his death in 2015), Nadasan was still living well with his family and reconciled with them.

At one point in his life after his acquittal, Nadasan became a taxi driver. In February 2012, 15 years after he escaped the death penalty, it was reported that Nadasan was a victim of assault at a supermarket in Yishun, when he was battered up by a Filipino waiter who accused him of cutting the queue; Nadasan had forgotten about a bottle of jam and had left the queue to retrieve it before his return, but his explanation was not accepted by the perpetrator and the perpetrator's wife. The 31-year-old Filipino, Benedict Policarpio Cortez, was found guilty and sentenced to one month of imprisonment for the assault, and he was also ordered to compensate Nadasan for his injuries (including a fractured jaw), which caused Nadasan to be warded for four days at Khoo Teck Puat Hospital.

=== In the media ===
Singaporean crime show True Files re-enacted the case and first aired the re-enactment as the seventh episode of the show's third season on 6 December 2004. Although Nadasan declined the production team's offer to interview him on camera, he said through his lawyer (who was interviewed in the episode) that he wanted to put everything behind him and move on with his life. Subhas also revealed he heard about Nadasan's job promotion during their last meeting and even added his feelings over the case. The names of Nadasan, Ramapiram and anyone related to the case were changed to protect their respective privacies.

The case of Nadasan's trial became one of the notable cases taken by Subhas Anandan, who wrote about the case in his memoir, The Best I Could. It was re-adapted into a television series in 2014 and Nadasan's case was re-enacted as the fifth episode of the show's first season.

=== Current status of case ===
As of today, the case remains unsolved, and the murderer(s) of Ramapiram Kannickaisparry was never identified or caught.

== See also ==
- Capital punishment in Singapore
- Death of Lim Shiow Rong
- Death of Winnifred Teo
- List of major crimes in Singapore
- List of unsolved murders (1980–1999)
