= List of people who died by hanging =

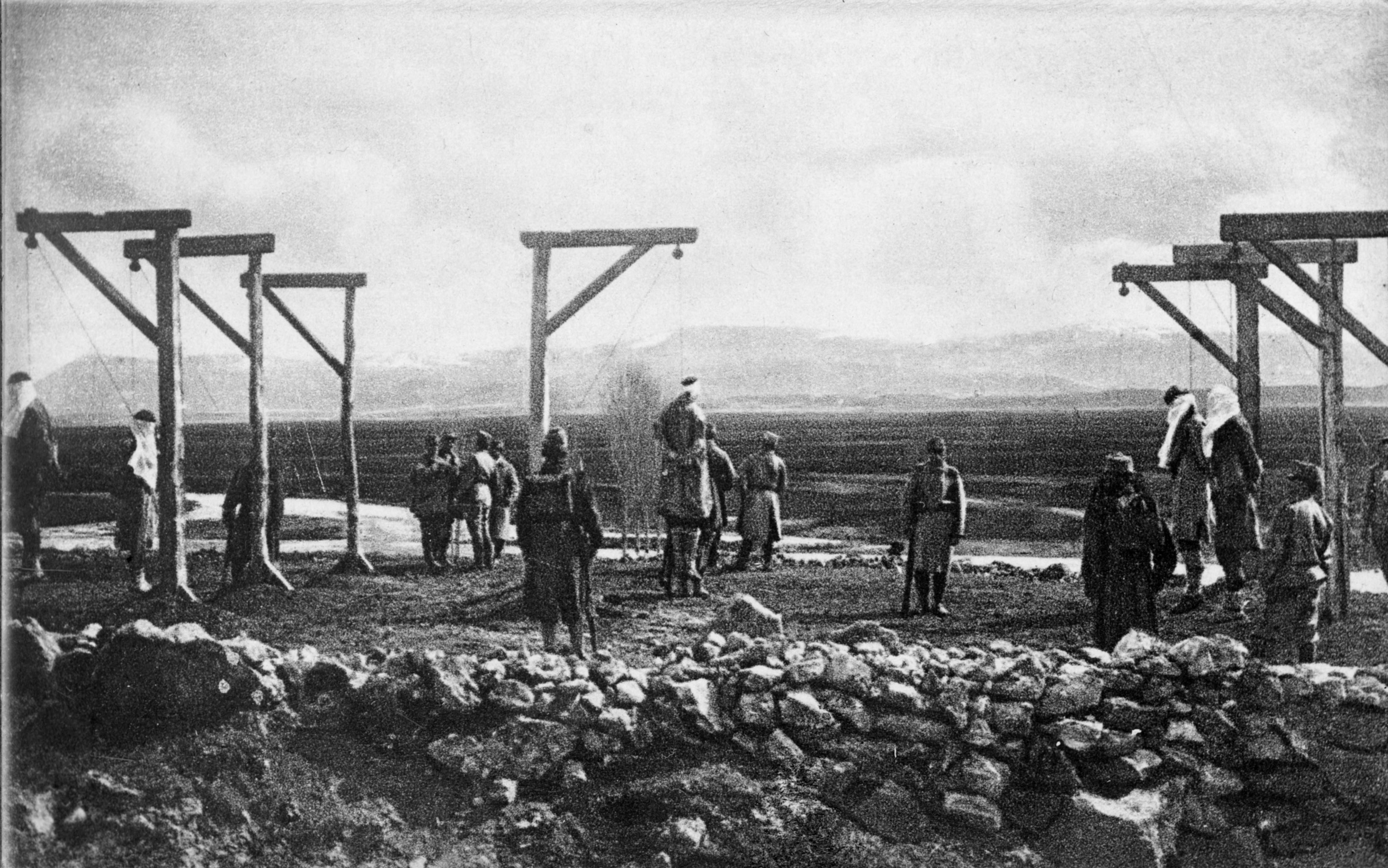
Serbs being executed in Austria-Hungary in World War I

This is a list of notable people who died as a result of hanging, including suicides and judicial, extrajudicial, or summary executions. These deaths are notable due to history or due to media exposure.

== Suicide by hanging ==
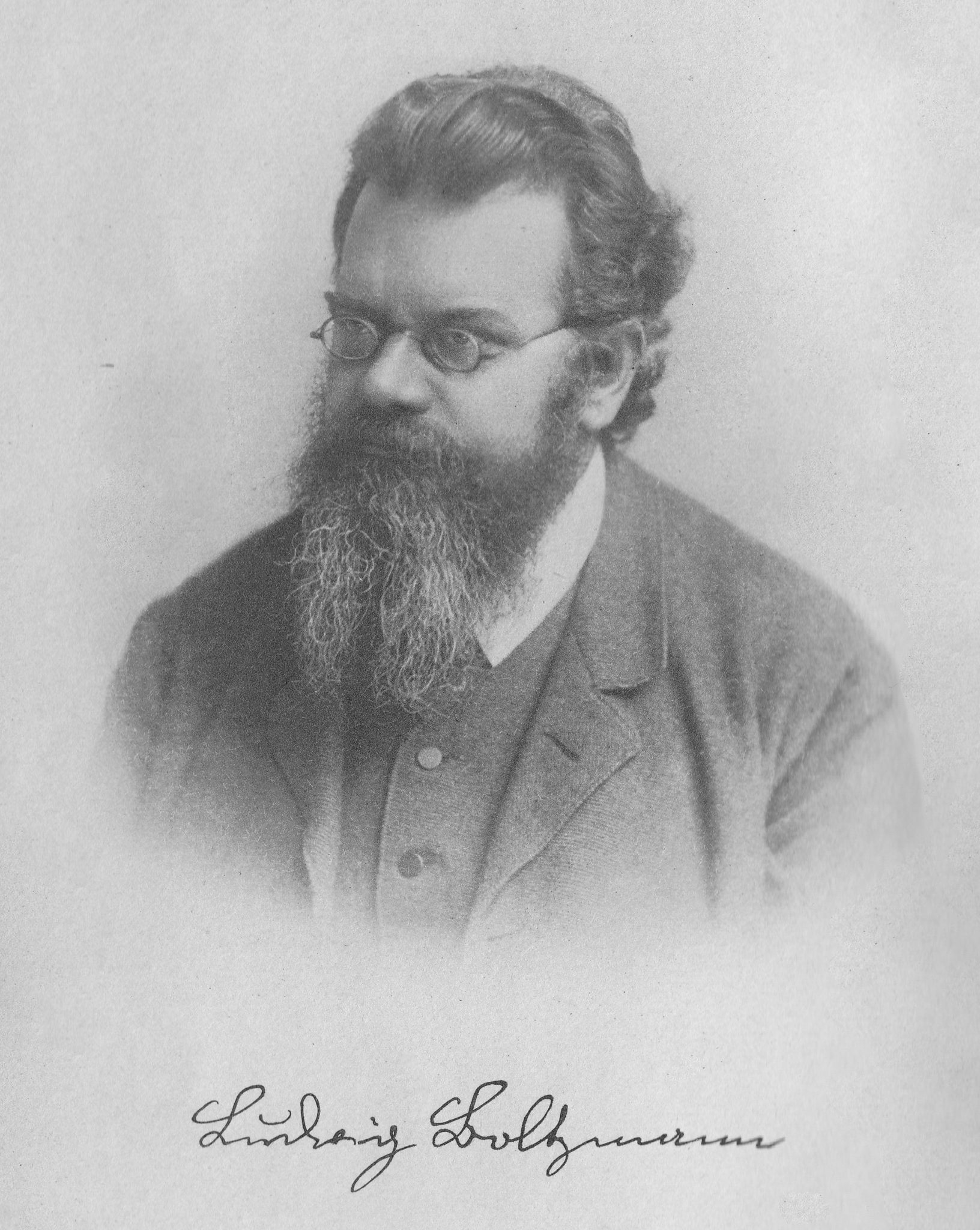
Ludwig Boltzmann, Austrian mathematician and theoretical physicist; while on vacation with family in Duino

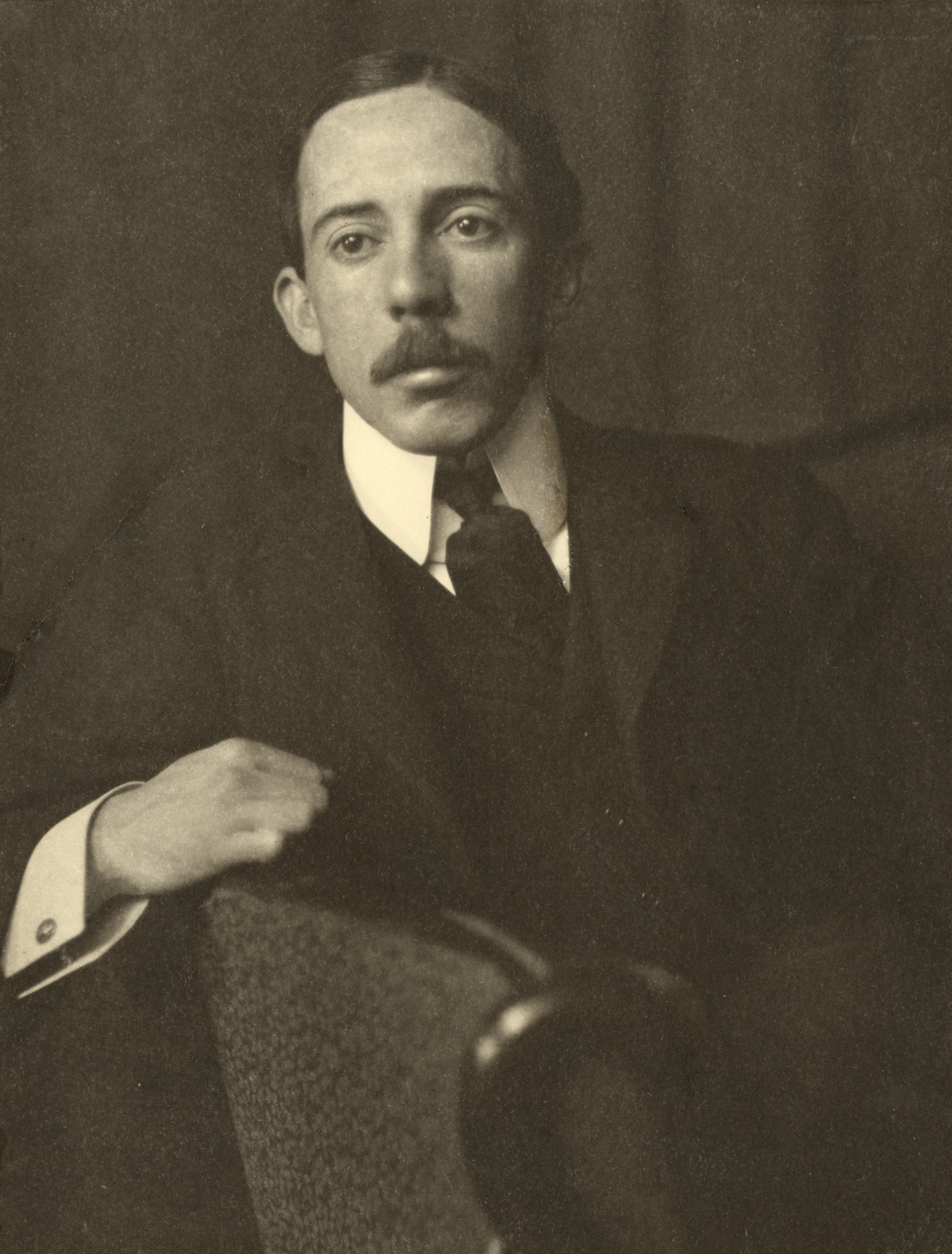
Alberto Santos-Dumont, Brazilian aeronaut, sportsman, inventor; in his hotel room

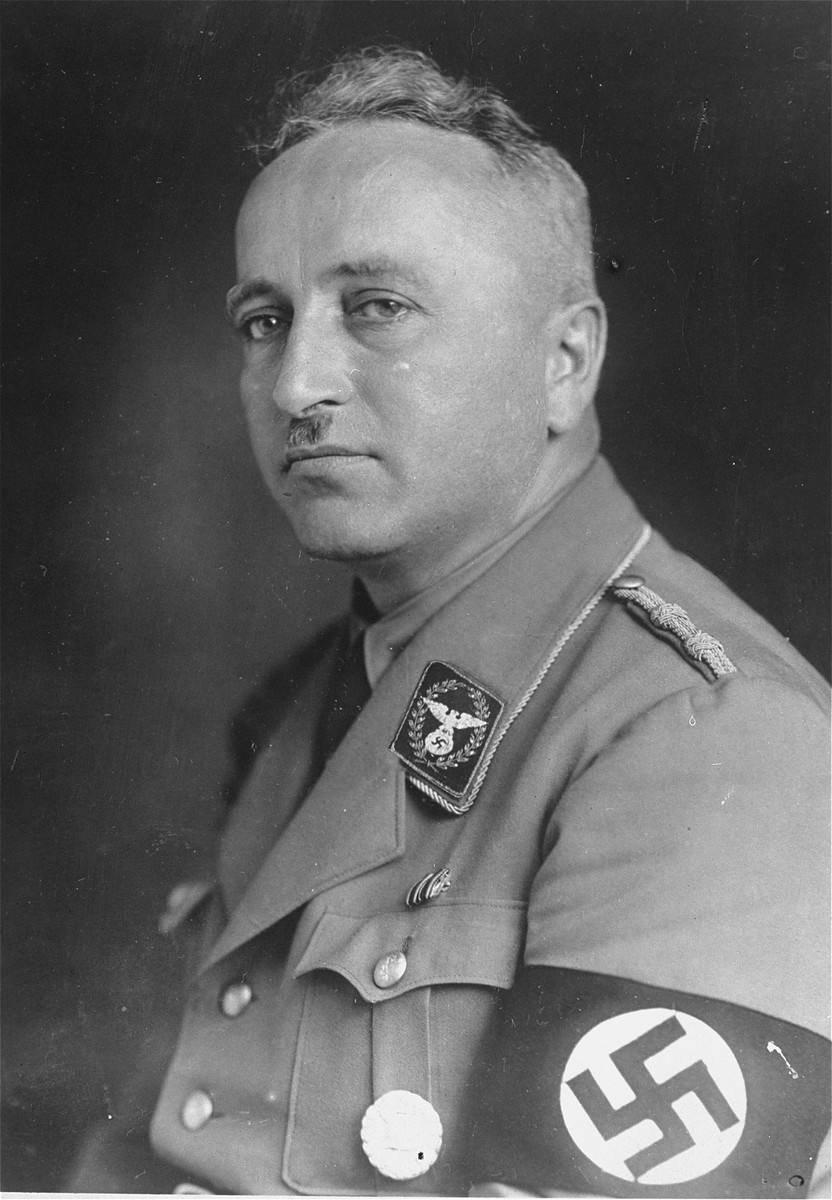
Robert Ley, German Nazi Reichsorganisationsleiter; in prison cell

Gustav Simon, German Nazi NSKK-Obergruppenführer; in prison cell

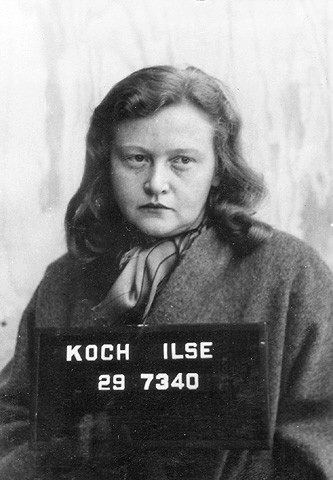
Ilse Koch, German Nazi overseer at Buchenwald concentration camp and Majdanek concentration camp; in prison cell

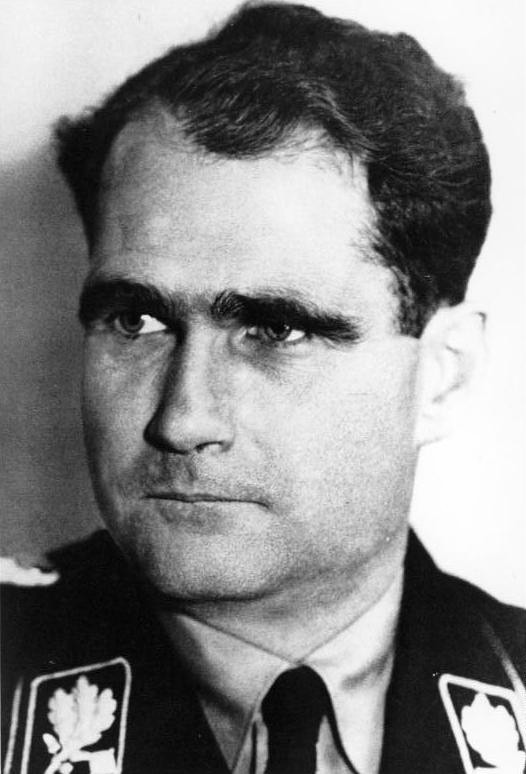
Rudolf Hess, German Nazi Deputy Führer to Hitler; in prison

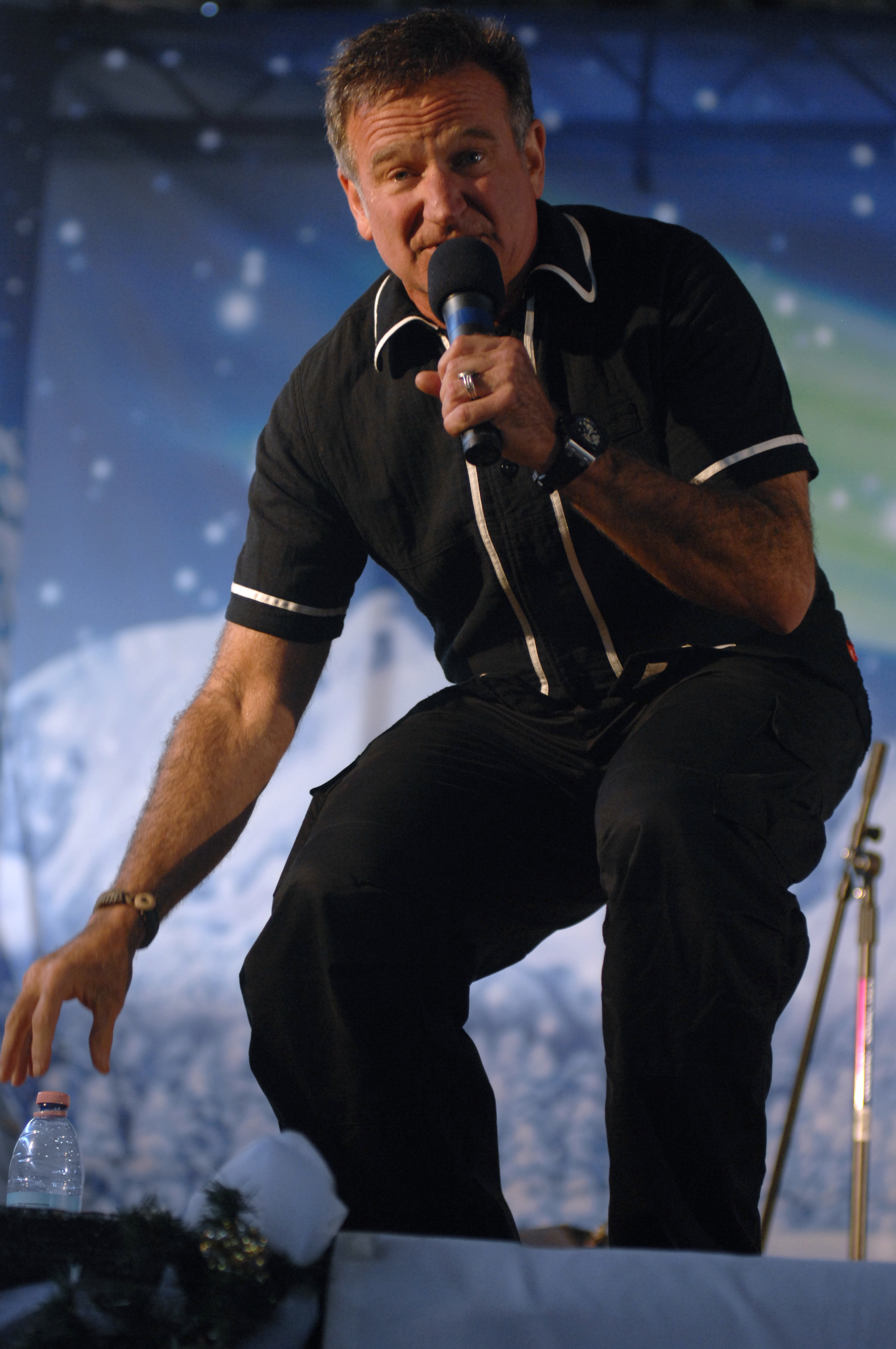
Robin Williams, American actor and comedian; in his home

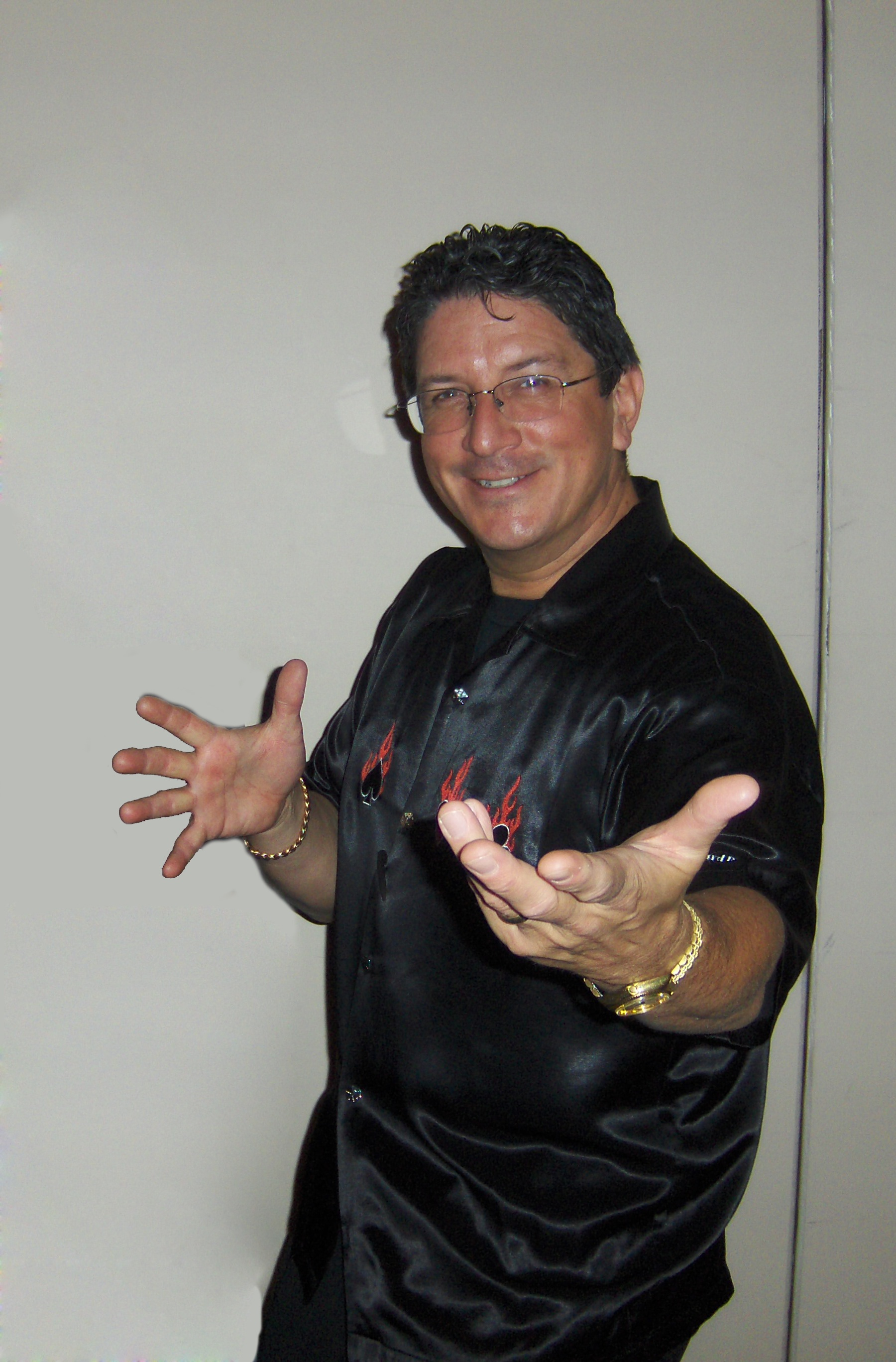
Daryl Easton, American magician; in his dressing room at Hollywood's Magic Castle

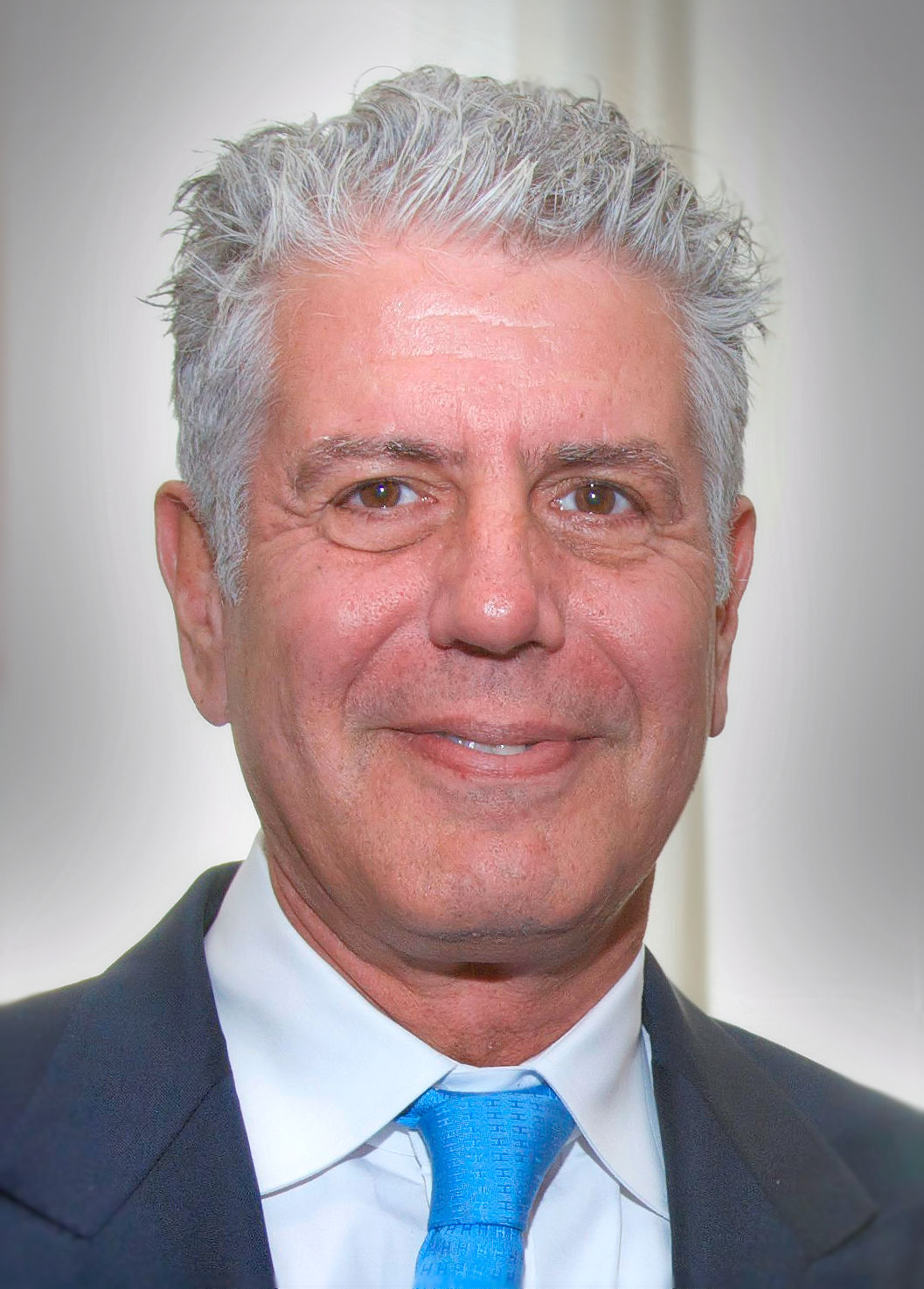
Anthony Bourdain, American celebrity chef, author and travel documentarian; in his hotel room

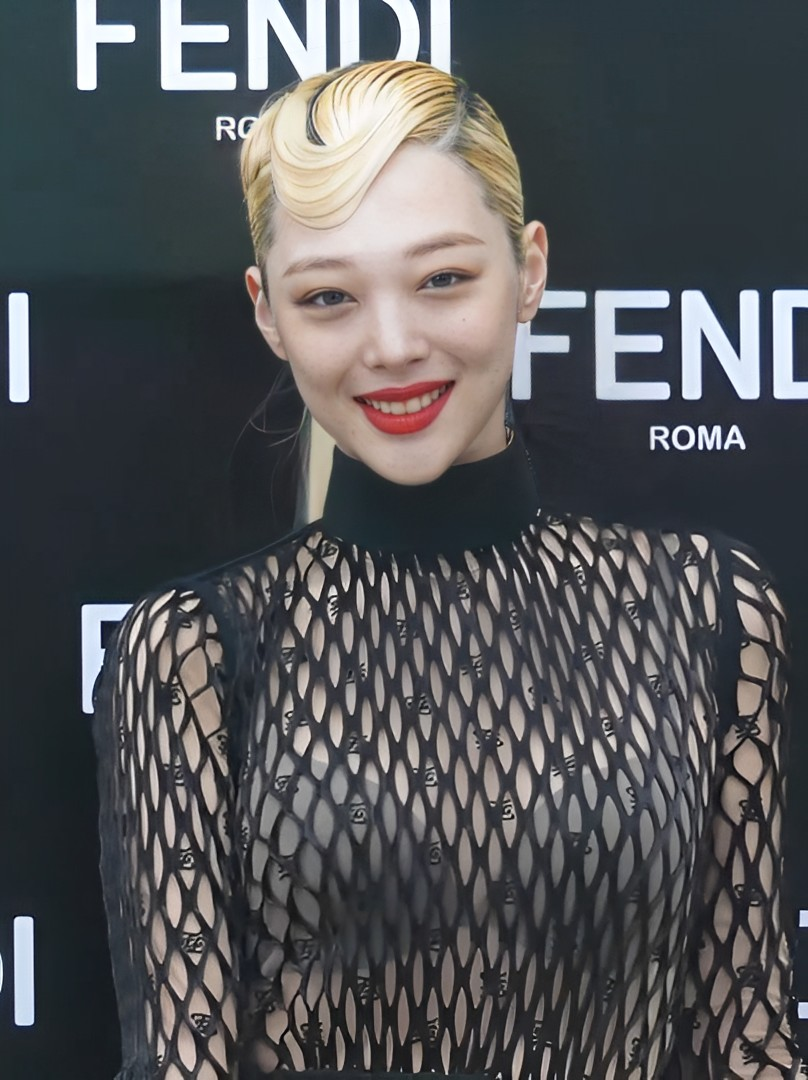
Sulli, South Korean singer and actress; in her home

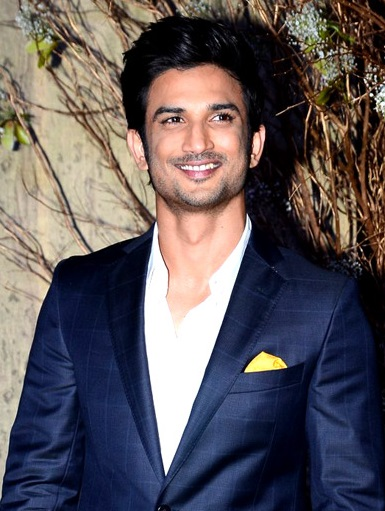
Sushant Singh Rajput, Indian actor; in his home

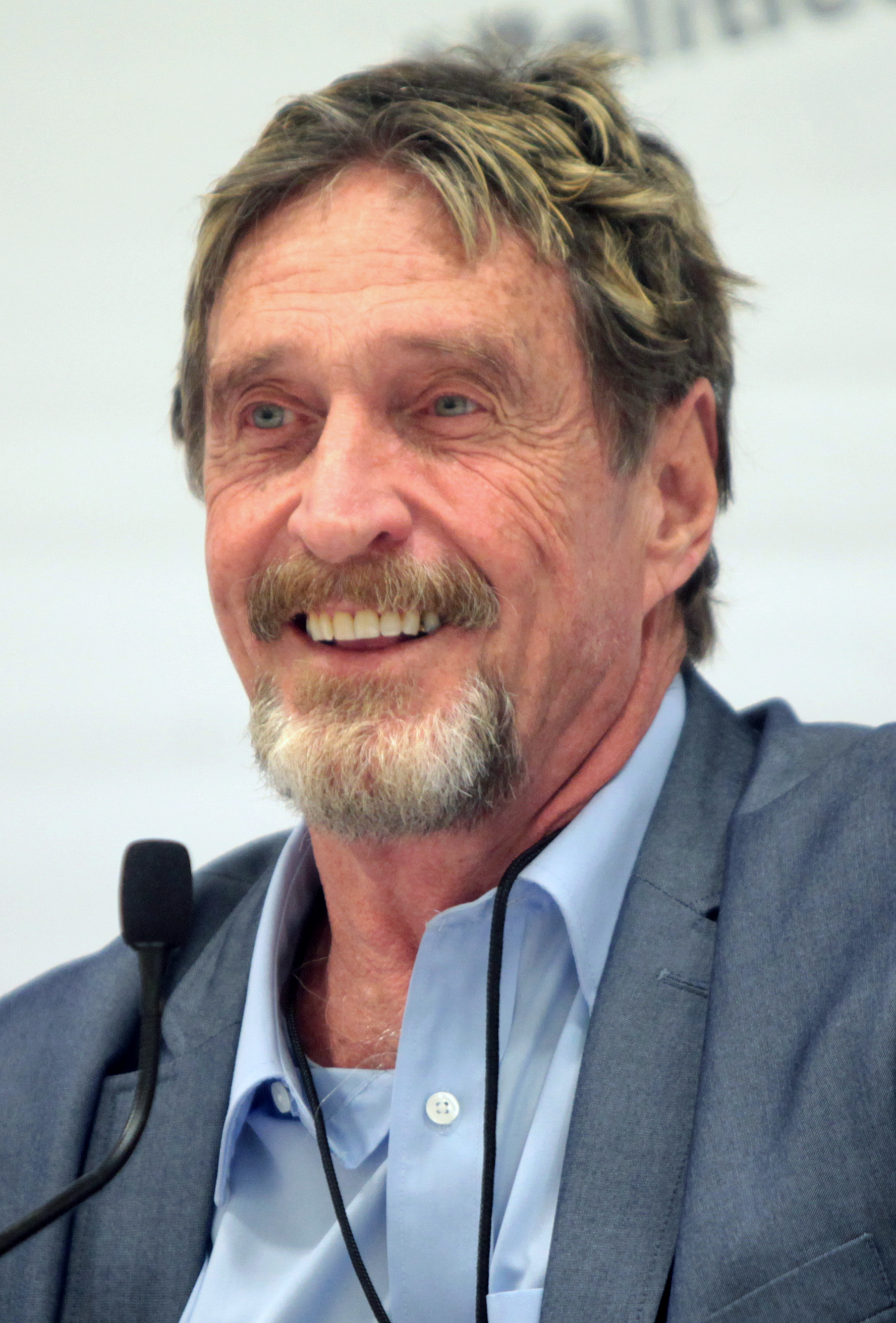
John McAfee, British and American computer programmer, businessman; in prison cell

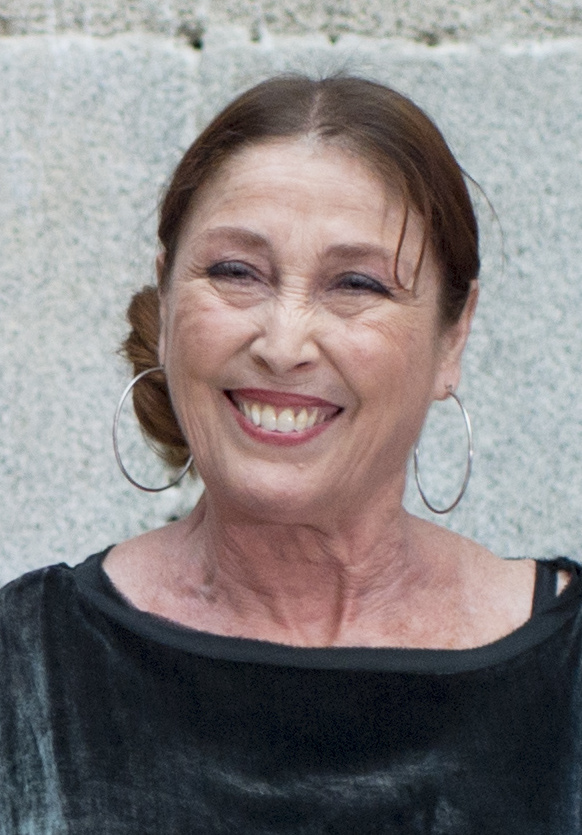
Verónica Forqué, Spanish actress; in her home

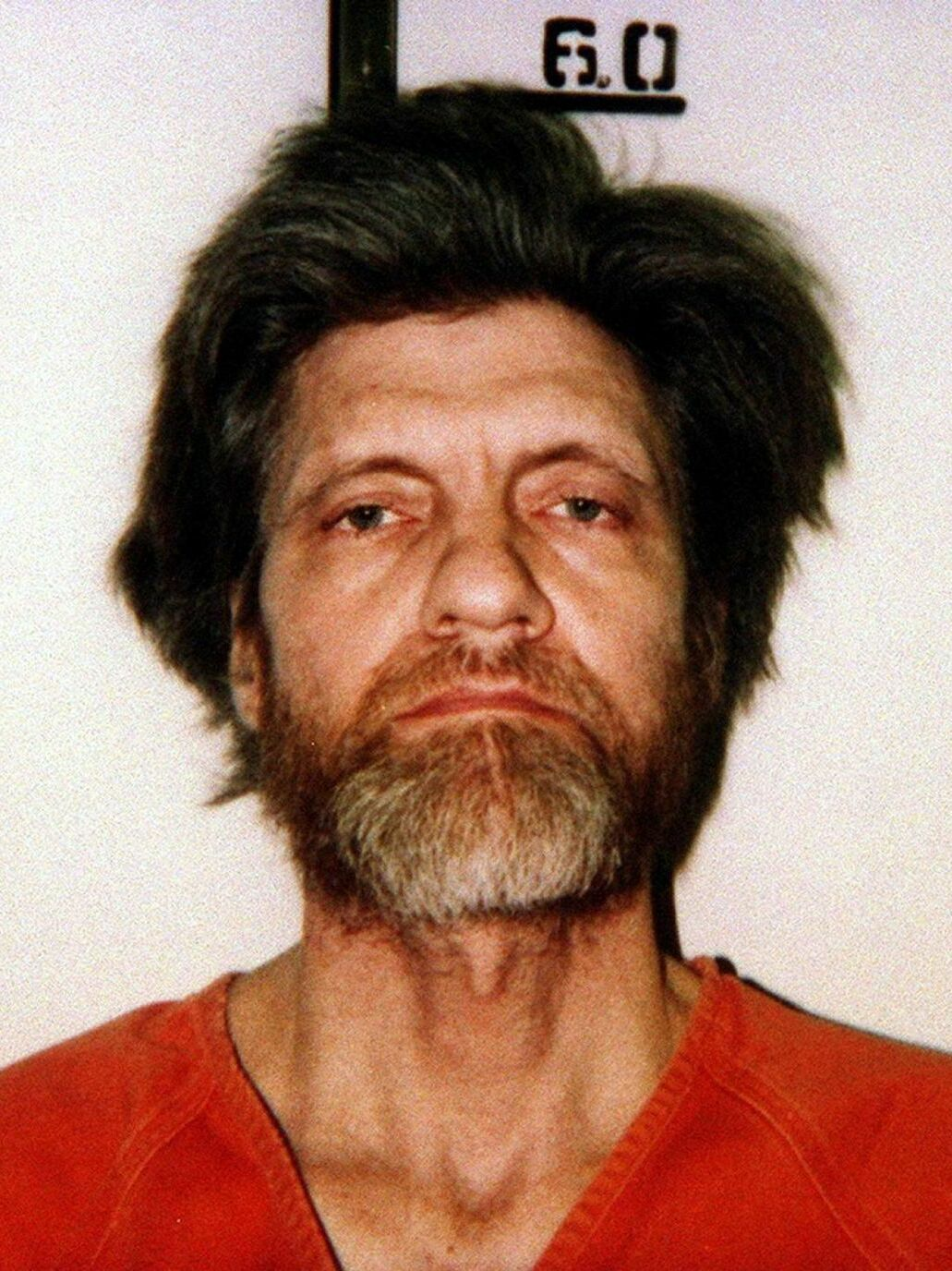
Ted Kaczynski, American mathematician and domestic terrorist; in prison cell

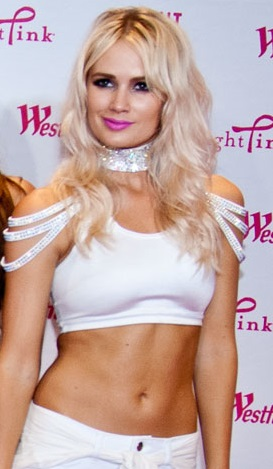
Lauren Bennett, English singer; in woodland near her home

RJ Mitte, American actor; in his home

- Emperor Aizong of Jin, emperor of China's Jin dynasty (14 February 1234)
- Chongzhen Emperor, emperor of China's Ming dynasty (25 April 1644)
- Gérard de Nerval, French poet and essayist (26 January 1855)
- Philipp Mainländer, German philosopher (1 April 1876)
- Ludwig Boltzmann, Austrian physicist, pioneer of statistical mechanics (5 September 1906)
- Sergei Yesenin, Russian poet, ex-husband of Isadora Duncan (27 December 1925)
- Nishinoumi Kajirō II, Japanese 25th yokozuna (27 January 1931)
- Alberto Santos-Dumont, Brazilian aviation pioneer (23 July 1932)
- Hans Berger, German inventor of electroencephalography (1 June 1941)
- Marina Tsvetayeva, Russian poet (31 August 1941)
- Eduard Wirths, German Nazi Chief SS Auschwitz concentration camp doctor (21 September 1945)
- Leonardo Conti, Nazi Reich Health Leader; in prison cell (6 October 1945)
- Robert Ley, German Nazi Reichsorganisationsleiter; in prison cell (25 October 1945)
- Charles Armijo Woodruff, 11th Governor of American Samoa (23 November 1945)
- Rudolf Jung, Nazi Director of Reich Inspection of Labour Administration; in prison cell (11 December 1945)
- Robert van Genechten, Dutch collaborator during German Nazi occupation of the Netherlands, in jail cell (13 December 1945)
- Gustav Simon, German Nazi NSKK-Obergruppenführer; in prison cell (18 December 1945)
- Hans Bothmann, German Nazi SS commandant of Chełmno extermination camp; while in custody (4 April 1946)
- Max Koegel, German Nazi SS commander of Lichtenburg concentration camp, Ravensbrück concentration camp, Majdanek concentration camp, and Flossenbürg concentration camp; in prison cell (27 June 1946)
- Carl Schneider, German Nazi Heidelberg University professor, researcher for Nazi euthanasia program; in prison cell (11 December 1946)
- Herbert Backe, German Nazi SS Obergruppenführer; in prison cell (6 April 1947)
- Irmfried Eberl, Austrian Nazi SS-Obersturmführer psychiatrist, commandant of Treblinka extermination camp (16 February 1948)
- Karl Jäger, Swiss-born German Nazi SS Einsatzkommando leader; in prison cell (22 May 1959)
- Wilfrid Garfield Case, Canadian Member of Parliament (22 September 1959)
- Otoya Yamaguchi, Japanese ultranationalist youth who assassinated Inejirō Asanuma, chairman of the Japan Socialist Party (2 November 1960)
- Hermann Höfle, Austrian-born Nazi SS commander and Holocaust perpetrator; in prison cell (21 August 1962)
- Werner Heyde, German Nazi SS psychiatrist, a main organizer of Nazi Germany's Euthanasia Program; in prison cell (13 February 1964)
- Frederick Fleet, British lookout on the Titanic who first spotted the iceberg (10 January 1965)
- Kurt Bolender, German Nazi SS sergeant who operated Sobibór extermination camp gas chambers; in prison cell (10 October 1966)
- Ilse Koch, German Nazi overseer at Buchenwald concentration camp and Majdanek concentration camp; in prison cell (1 September 1967)
- Fu Qifang, Chinese table tennis player and coach (16 April 1968)
- Jiang Yongning, Chinese table tennis player and coach (16 May 1968)
- Rong Guotuan, Chinese table tennis player and coach (20 June 1968)
- Mack Ray Edwards, American child sex abuser and serial killer; in prison cell (30 October 1971)
- Frei Tito, Brazilian friar (10 August 1974)
- Pete Ham, Welsh guitarist and singer of rock band Badfinger (23 April 1975)
- Phil Ochs, American singer-songwriter and activist (9 April 1976)
- Ulrike Meinhof, imprisoned member of the German Red Army Faction, (9 May 1976)
- David Munrow, British musician and early music historian (15 May 1976)
- Gudrun Ensslin, imprisoned member of the German Red Army Faction, circumstances questionable (18 October 1977)
- Ian Curtis, English lead singer of Joy Division (18 May 1980)
- Trent Lehman, American former child actor of Nanny and the Professor (18 January 1982)
- Tom Evans, British member of the rock band Badfinger (19 November 1983)
- Richard "Ricky" Kasso, American murderer, and drug dealer (7 July 1984)
- Stella Strada, Filipino actress (28 December 1984)
- Pepsi Paloma, Filipino actress (31 May 1985)
- Richard Manuel, Canadian musician best known for his membership in The Band (4 March 1986)
- Rudolf Hess, German Nazi Deputy Führer to Hitler and convicted criminal; in prison (17 August 1987)
- Valery Legasov, Soviet chemist and lead investigator of the Chernobyl Disaster (27 April 1988)
- Jiang Qing, Chinese political figure, wife of Mao Zedong (14 May 1991)
- Michael Gothard, British actor (2 December 1992)
- Buster Edwards, British Great Train Robber (28 November 1994)
- Fred West, British serial killer (1 January 1995)
- Cheyenne Brando, Tahitian daughter of Marlon Brando (16 April 1995)
- Duc Cong Huynh, one of the two perpetrators of the 1994 Reno U-Haul murders (26 December 1995)
- Kim Kwang-Seok, South Korean folk rock singer (6 January 1996)
- Luigi Pistilli, Italian actor (21 April 1996)
- Ray Combs, American host of Family Feud from 1988 to 1994 (2 June 1996)
- Terence Donovan, British fashion photographer (22 November 1996)
- Michael Hutchence, Australian lead singer of INXS (22 November 1997)
- Rozz Williams, American musician, founder of Christian Death (1 April 1998)
- Justin Fashanu, English footballer (2 May 1998)
- Hide, Japanese rock musician (2 May 1998)
- Sarah Kane, British playwright (20 February 1999)
- Mackey Feary, American lead singer of Hawaiian band Kalapana (20 February 1999)
- David Strickland, American actor, best known for his character Todd on Suddenly Susan (22 March 1999)
- Screaming Lord Sutch, British musician, Best known for his song "Jack the Ripper", and his album Lord Sutch and Heavy Friends (16 June 1999)"
- Petr Lébl, Czech theatre director (11 December 1999)
- Justin Pierce, British-born American skateboarder and actor (10 July 2000)
- Stuart Adamson, British musician (16 December 2001)
- Jon Lee, Welsh drummer with Feeder (7 January 2002)
- Maury Travis, American serial killer (10 June 2002)
- Ryan Halligan, American 13-year-old schoolboy (7 October 2003)
- Jonathan Brandis, American actor (12 November 2003)
- Harold Shipman, English doctor and serial killer, convicted of murder and sentenced to life imprisonment (13 January 2004)
- Jason Raize, American actor and singer (4 February 2004)
- Nafisa Joseph, Indian model and video jockey (29 July 2004)
- Norman "Dinky" Diamond, British drummer with Sparks in the 1970s (10 September 2004)
- Charlie Brandt, American murderer and suspected serial killer (13 September 2004)
- Lee Eun-ju, South Korean actress and singer (22 February 2005)
- Paul Hester, former drummer of Crowded House (26 March 2005)
- Kuljeet Randhawa, Indian model and actress (8 February 2006)
- Jon Dough, American adult film actor (27 August 2006)
- Megan Meier, American 13-year-old schoolgirl (17 October 2006)
- U;Nee, South Korean singer and actress (21 January 2007)
- Jung Da Bin, South Korean actress (10 February 2007)
- Mike Awesome, American former professional wrestler, twice ECW Champion (17 February 2007)
- Kevin Whitrick, British online suicide via webcam (21 March 2007)
- Toshikatsu Matsuoka, Japanese politician (28 May 2007)
- Chris Benoit, Canadian professional wrestler (24 June 2007)
- John David Roy Atchison, US Attorney and children's sports coach, in a prison after being charged with soliciting sex from a child (5 October 2007)
- Kunal Singh, Indian actor (7 February 2008)
- Mark Speight, British children's television presenter (7 April 2008)
- Deborah Jeane Palfrey, operator of an escort agency in Washington, D.C. (1 May 2008)
- David Foster Wallace, the American author of Infinite Jest (12 September 2008)
- Choi Jin-sil, South Korean actress (2 October 2008)
- Kurt Demmler, German songwriter accused of sexual abuse of underage girls; in prison cell (3 February 2009)
- Jang Ja-yeon, South Korean actress (7 March 2009)
- Lucy Gordon, English actress and model (20 May 2009)
- Daul Kim, South Korean-born model who modeled in France (19 November 2009)
- Phoebe Prince, a 15-year-old schoolgirl (14 January 2010)
- Alexander McQueen, British fashion designer (11 February 2010)
- Ambrose Olsen, American male model (22 April 2010)
- Choi Jin-young, South Korean brother of Choi Jin-sil (29 March 2010)
- Viveka Babajee, Mauritian model and actress (25 June 2010)
- Alex Whybrow, American professional wrestler better known as Larry Sweeney (11 April 2011)
- Miyu Uehara, Japanese glamour model (12 May 2011)
- Andrzej Lepper, former Deputy Prime Minister of Poland and former Minister of Agriculture of Poland (5 August 2011)
- Jamey Rodemeyer, American 14-year-old student (September 2011)
- Gary Speed, Wales national football team manager and former football player (27 November 2011)
- Ivan Pravilov, Ukrainian hockey coach, in prison as he awaited trial for alleged sexual abuse of teenager he coached (10 February 2012)
- Amanda Todd, Canadian student and victim of sextortion and bullying (10 October 2012)
- Jacintha Saldanha, Indian nurse who worked at King Edward VII's Hospital in the City of Westminster, London (7 December 2012)
- Cho Sung-min, South Korean ex-husband of Choi Jin-sil (6 January 2013)
- Aaron Swartz, American 26-year-old computer programmer and Internet activist (11 January 2013)
- Ram Singh, one of the culprits of the 2012 Delhi gang rape and murder case. He allegedly hanged himself in his cell (11 March 2013)
- Jiah Khan, British-American Bollywood actress (3 June 2013)
- Gia Allemand, American actress, model, and reality television contestant (14 August 2013)
- Ariel Castro, convicted kidnapper and rapist (3 September 2013)
- Uday Kiran, South Indian actor (5 January 2014)
- Charlotte Dawson, New Zealand-born Australian television personality (22 February 2014)
- L'Wren Scott, American fashion model, fashion designer, and costume designer (17 March 2014)
- Fausto Fanti, Brazilian humorist, founding member of Hermes & Renato and guitarist of Massacration (30 July 2014)
- Yoshiki Sasai, Japanese stem cell researcher (5 August 2014)
- Robin Williams, American actor and comedian (11 August 2014)
- Simone Battle, American X-Factor contestant, singer and member of the band G.R.L. (5 September 2014)
- Sean O'Haire, American professional wrestler (8 September 2014)
- Alok Nembang, Nepali film and music video director (6 November 2014)
- Lil' Chris, English singer-songwriter, actor and television personality (23 March 2015)
- Joseph A. Bennett, English actor (13 April 2015)
- Homaro Cantu, American chef and inventor (14 April 2015)
- Kalief Browder, falsely imprisoned African American youth (6 June 2015)
- Julia Buencamino, Filipino teen actress (7 July 2015)
- Eduardo Bonvallet, Chilean footballer (18 September 2015)
- Ranganath, South Indian actor (19 December 2015)
- Ian Murdock, American software engineer, known for being the founder of the Debian project and Progeny Linux Systems (28 December 2015)
- Rohith Vemula, Indian Ph.D. student (17 January 2016)
- Daryl Easton, American magician (24 February 2017)
- Pratyusha Banerjee, Indian television actress (1 April 2016)
- Mark Fisher, English writer, music critic, cultural theorist, philosopher and teacher (13 January 2017)
- Alec Kreider, American convicted murderer; in prison cell (20 January 2017)
- Aaron Hernandez, former NFL player (19 April 2017)
- František Rajtoral, Czech footballer (23 April 2017)
- Chris Cornell, American musician, frontman of Soundgarden, Audioslave and Temple of the Dog (18 May 2017)
- Stevie Ryan, American YouTuber, actress and comedian (1 July 2017)
- Chester Bennington, American musician and frontman of Linkin Park, singer and founder/frontman of Dead by Sunrise (20 July 2017)
- August Ames, Canadian pornographic actress (5 December 2017)
- Mark Salling, American actor (30 January 2018)
- Boaz Arad, Israeli artist (2 February 2018)
- Jo Min-ki, South Korean actor (9 March 2018)
- Kate Spade, American fashion designer (5 June 2018)
- Anthony Bourdain, American chef, author, and television personality (8 June 2018)
- Oksana Shachko, Ukrainian artist and activist, co-founder of Femen (23 July 2018)
- Ellie Soutter, British snowboarder (25 July 2018)
- Brian Christopher, American professional wrestler, son of WWE Hall of Famer Jerry "The King" Lawler (29 July 2018)
- Brody Stevens, American comedian and actor (22 February 2019)
- Keith Flint, English vocalist, dancer and motorcycle racer, frontman of The Prodigy (4 March 2019)
- Mike Thalassitis, English television personality and professional footballer (15 March 2019)
- Ashley Massaro, American professional wrestler and model (16 May 2019)
- David Berman, American musician and poet, founder of the Silver Jews (7 August 2019)
- Jeffrey Epstein, American financier, in prison as he awaited trial for alleged sexual abuse of teenager (10 August 2019)
- Kodela Siva Prasada Rao, Indian politician (16 September 2019)
- Sulli, South Korean singer, songwriter and actress, member of f(x) (14 October 2019)
- Kushal Punjabi, Indian actor (26 December 2019)
- Stan Kirsch, American actor (11 January 2020)
- Caroline Flack, English television and radio presenter (15 February 2020)
- Hayden Hunstable, 12-year-old son of Brad Hunstable (17 April 2020)
- Flávio Migliaccio, Brazilian actor and film director (4 May 2020)
- Jas Waters, American screenwriter and journalist (9 June 2020)
- Sushant Singh Rajput, Indian actor (14 June 2020)
- Haruma Miura, Japanese actor and singer (18 July 2020)
- Sameer Sharma, Indian television actor (4 August 2020)
- Xavier Ortiz, Mexican actor, singer, model, television presenter and entrepreneur (7 September 2020)
- Yuko Takeuchi, Japanese actress (27 September 2020)
- Anthony Galindo, Venezuelan singer, model, and entertainer (3 October 2020)
- Ashwani Kumar, Indian police officer and politician (7 October 2020)
- Asif Basra, Indian actor (12 November 2020)
- Jamir Garcia, Filipino singer and frontman of Slapshock (26 November 2020)
- V. J. Chitra, Indian television actress (9 December 2020)
- John McAfee, British-American computer programmer and businessman, founder of McAfee (23 June 2021)
- Matt Holmes, British former Commandant General Royal Marines (2 October 2021)
- Verónica Forqué, Spanish actress (13 December 2021)
- Paul Green, Australian rugby league player and coach (11 August 2022)
- Vaishali Takkar, Indian actress (15 October 2022)
- Jason David Frank, American actor and mixed martial artist (19 November 2022)
- Tunisha Sharma, Indian television and film actress (24 December 2022)
- Ted Kaczynski, American mathematician and domestic terrorist (10 June 2023)
- PC Siqueira, Brazilian YouTuber, presenter, and comic book colourist (27 December 2023)
- Arstanbek Abdyldayev, Kyrgyz political activist (5 January 2024)
- Clement Kemboi, Kenyan middle-distance runner (7 October 2024)
- Jeff Baena, American screenwriter and film director (3 January 2025)
- Nicky Katt, Mexican-American actor (7 April 2025)
- Ricky Hatton, British professional boxer (14 September 2025)
- Emman Atienza, Filipino-Taiwanese social media influencer and daughter of Kim Atienza (22 October 2025)
- James Ransone, American actor (19 December 2025)
- Robert Carradine, American actor (23 February 2026)
- Lauren Bennett, English The X Factor contestant, singer and former member of Paradiso Girls and G.R.L. (29 May 2026)
- RJ Mitte, American actor (12 October 2026)

== Capital punishment by hanging ==
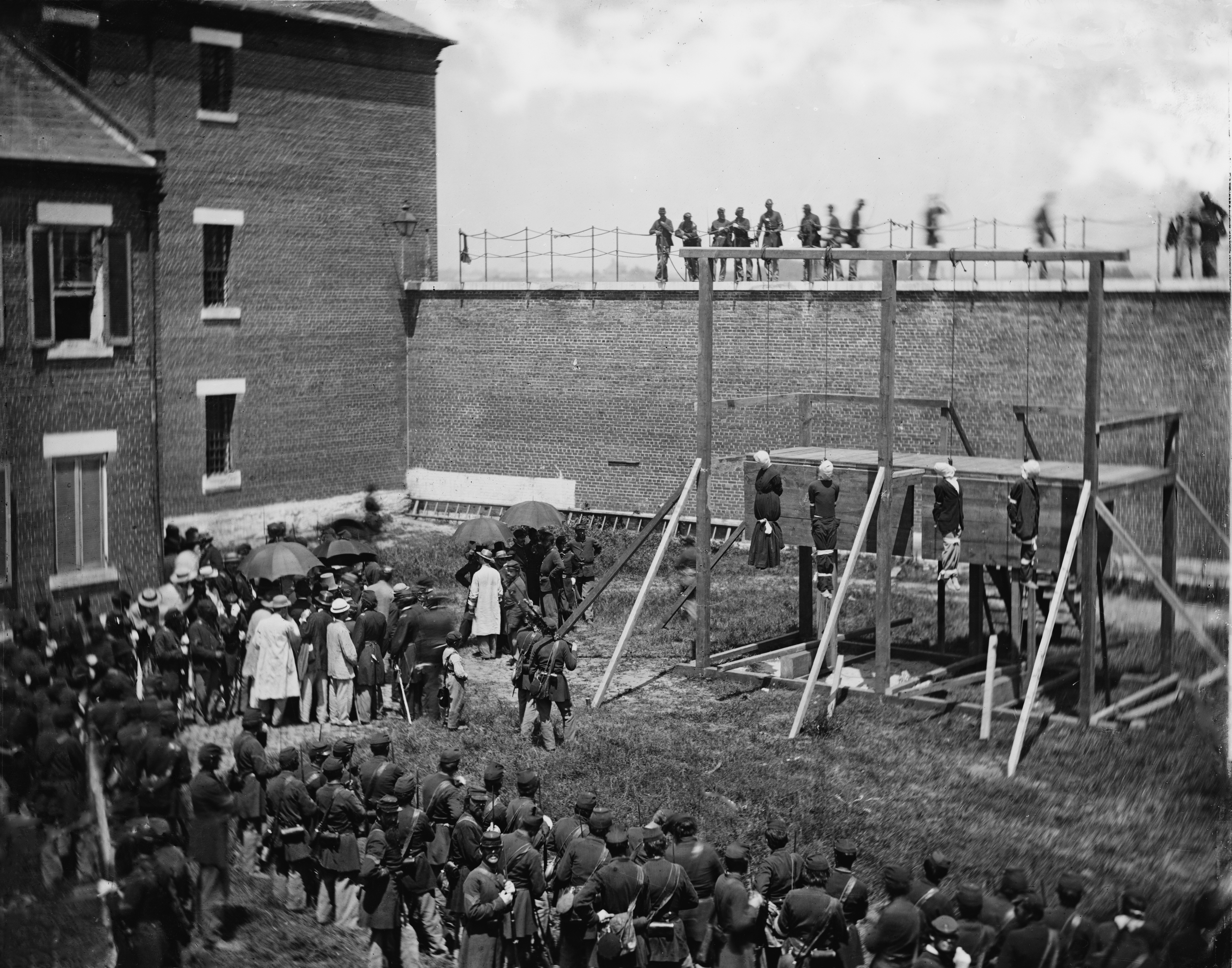
Execution of Lincoln assassination conspirators Mary Surratt, Lewis Powell, David Herold, and George Atzerodt

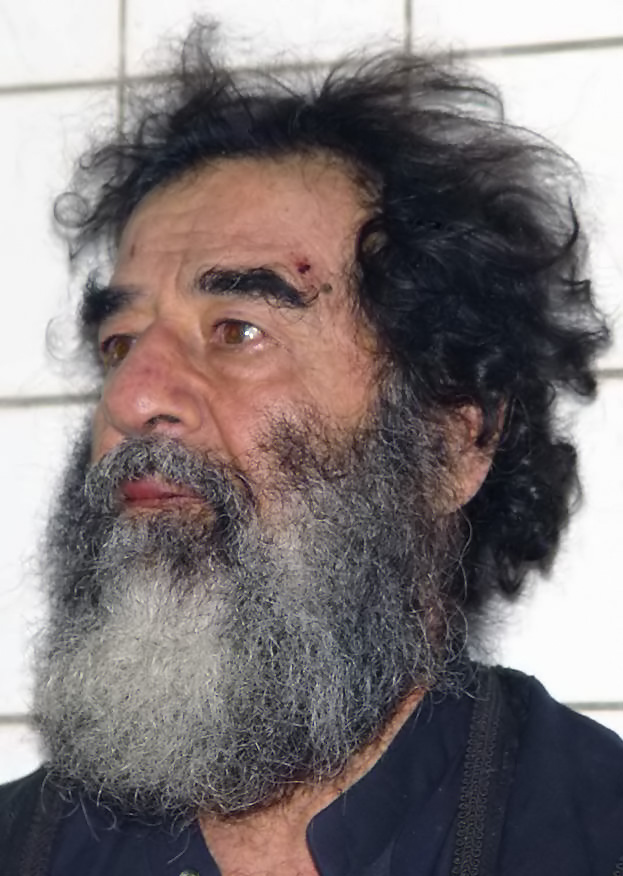
Saddam Hussein, President of Iraq and war criminal

Adolf Eichmann, German Nazi major organizer of the Holocaust and war criminal

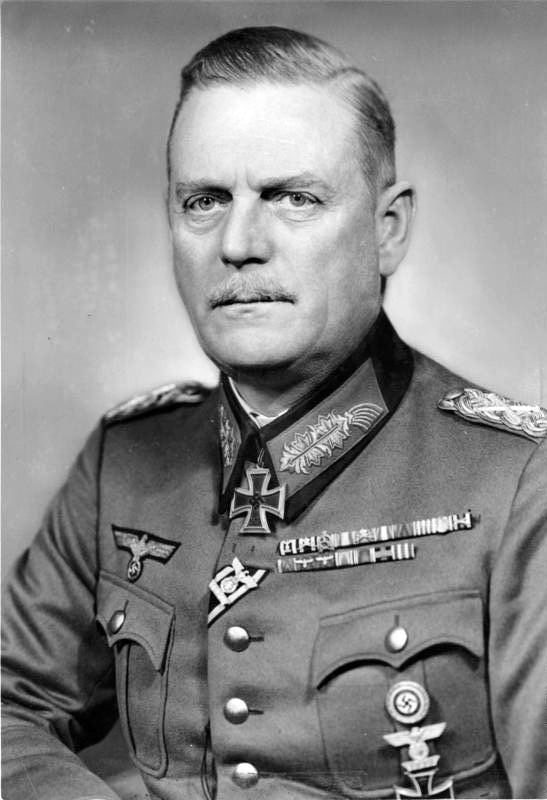
Wilhelm Keitel, German Nazi head of the Oberkommando der Wehrmacht and war criminal

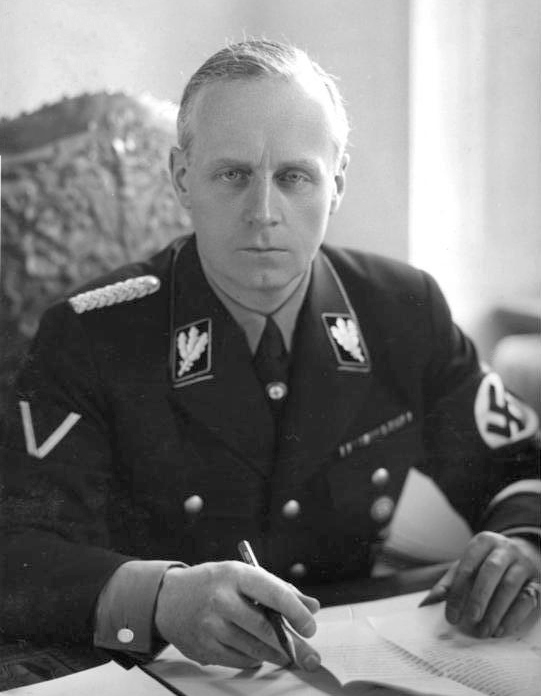
Joachim von Ribbentrop, German Nazi foreign minister and war criminal

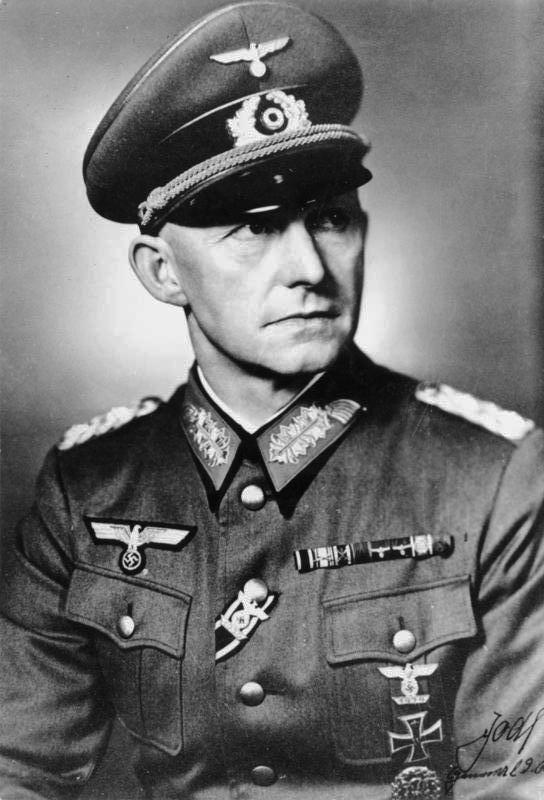
Alfred Jodl, German Nazi Chief of the Operations Staff of the Oberkommando der Wehrmacht and war criminal

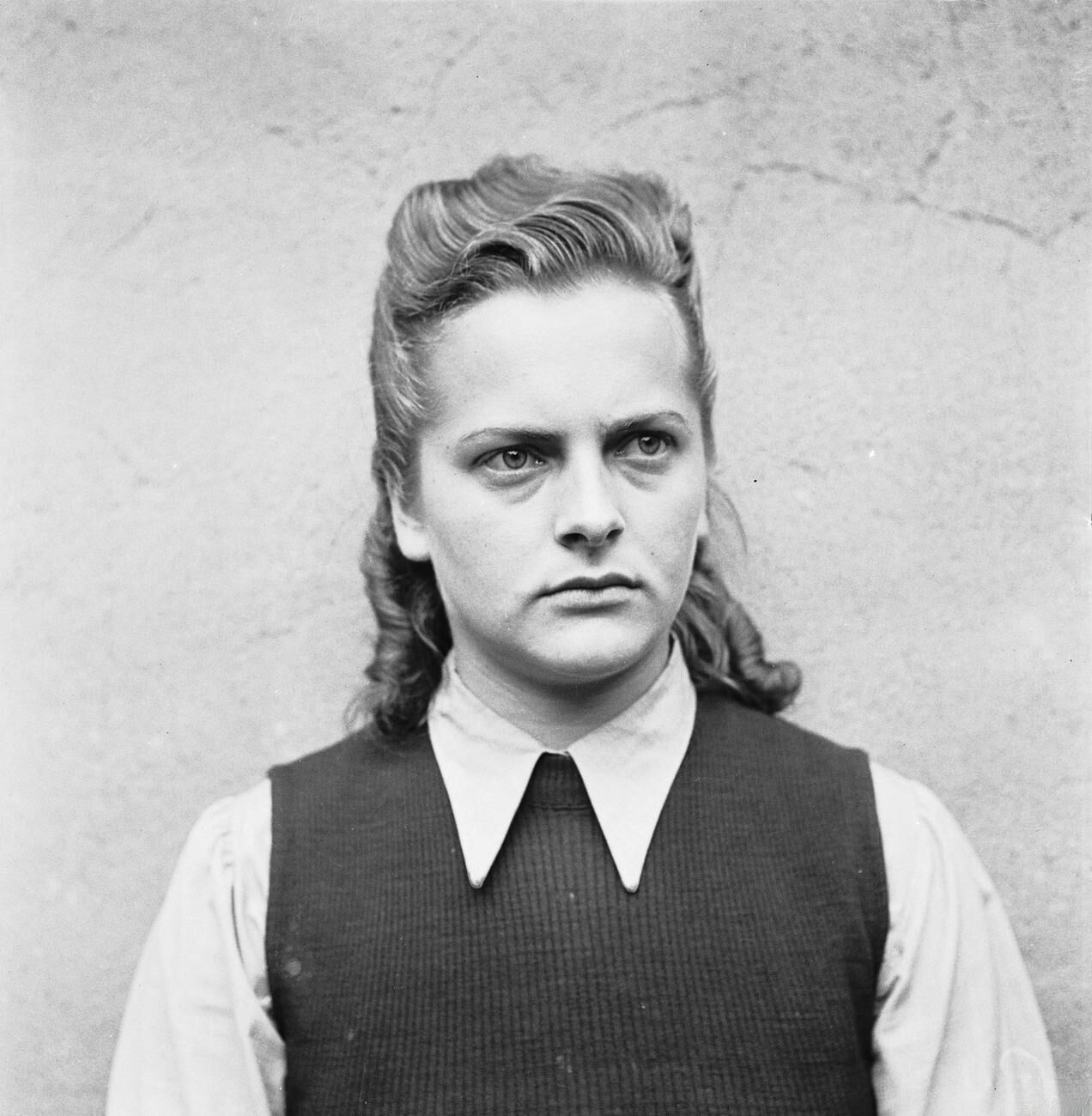
Irma Grese, German Nazi concentration camp guard and war criminal

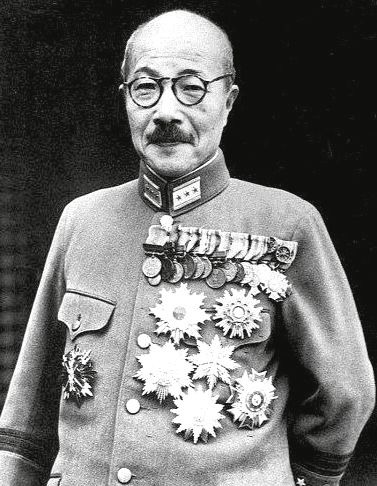
Hideki Tojo, Prime Minister of Japan and war criminal

- Fu Jian, emperor of Former Qin (385)
- Emperor Yang of Sui, second and last emperor of the Sui dynasty (11 April 618)
- Zhangsun Wuji, Chinese chancellor of the Tang dynasty (659)
- Yang Guifei, consort of Emperor Xuanzong of Tang who was thought of the cause of An Lushan Rebellion (15 July 756)
- Yan Zhenqing, Chinese calligrapher, military general, and politician of the Tang dynasty (785)
- Yue Fei, Chinese military general, calligrapher, and poet of the Song dynasty (28 January 1142)
- Dulla Bhatti, Punjabi who led a revolt against Mughal rule during the rule of the emperor Akbar (1599)
- Nian Gengyao, Chinese military commander of the Qing dynasty (13 January 1726)
- Maharaja Nandakumar, Indian tax collector on false allegations which led to the impeachment of Warren Hastings (5 August 1775)
- Nathan Hale, American patriot (22 September 1776)
- John André, British officer, for espionage (2 October 1780)
- Mangal Pandey, leader of Indian Sepoy Mutiny (8 April 1857)
- Jemadar Iswari Prasad, part of Indian Sepoy Mutiny (21 April 1857)
- John Brown, militant U.S. anti-slavery activist (2 December 1859)
- Boone Helm, American frontier outlaw and serial killer known as "The Kentucky Cannibal" (14 January 1864)
- George Atzerodt, conspirator in the assassination of Abraham Lincoln (7 July 1865)
- David Herold, conspirator in the assassination of Abraham Lincoln (7 July 1865)
- Lewis Powell, conspirator in the assassination of Abraham Lincoln (7 July 1865)
- Mary Surratt, conspirator in the assassination of Abraham Lincoln (7 July 1865)
- Henry Wirz, Confederate commandant of the notorious Andersonville POW camp (10 November 1865)
- Tom Dula, inspiration for the song "Tom Dooley", for murder (1 May 1868)
- Kate Webster, murderer of Julia Martha Thomas (29 July 1879)
- Ned Kelly, Australian bushranger, (11 November 1880)
- Charles Guiteau, American assassin of President James A. Garfield (30 June 1882)
- Louis Riel, Canadian political activist, for high treason (6 November 1885)
- Aleksandr Ulyanov, Russian revolutionary and brother of Vladimir Lenin, for plot to assassinate Tsar Alexander III (8 May 1887)
- William Henry Bury, murderer and Jack the Ripper suspect (24 April 1889)
- H. H. Holmes, American serial killer and con man (7 May 1896)
- Tom "Black Jack" Ketchum, American Old West outlaw (26 April 1901)
- Tom Horn, American frontier scout, lawman, private detective, and hired killer (20 November 1903)
- Khudiram Bose, Indian revolutionary (11 August 1908)
- Satyendranath Basu, Indian revolutionary (21 November 1908)
- An Jung-geun, Korean-independence activist, known for assassinating Itō Hirobumi (26 March 1910)
- Hawley Harvey Crippen, convicted wife murderer (23 November 1910)
- Basanta Kumar Biswas, Indian revolutionary (11 May 1915)
- Niren Dasgupta, Indian revolutionary (15 October 1915)
- Manoranjan Sengupta, Indian revolutionary (15 October 1915)
- Roger Casement, Irish nationalist (3 August 1916)
- Kevin Barry, Irish nationalist militant (1 November 1920)
- Gopinath Saha, Indian revolutionary (1 March 1924)
- Pramod Ranjan Choudhury, Indian revolutionary (28 September 1926)
- Rajendra Lahiri, Indian revolutionary (17 December 1927)
- Ram Prasad Bismil, Indian revolutionary (19 December 1927)
- Ashfaqulla Khan, Indian revolutionary (19 December 1927)
- Roshan Singh, Indian revolutionary (19 December 1927)
- Shivaram Rajguru, Indian revolutionary (23 March 1931)
- Sukhdev Thapar, Indian revolutionary (23 March 1931)
- Bhagat Singh, Indian revolutionary (23 March 1931)
- Hari Kishan Talwar, Indian revolutionary (9 June 1931)
- Dinesh Gupta, Indian revolutionary (7 July 1931)
- Tarakeswar Dastidar, Indian revolutionary (12 January 1934)
- Surya Sen, Indian revolutionary (12 January 1934)
- Rainey Bethea, last public hanging in Kentucky, for rape and murder (14 August 1936)
- Roscoe "Red" Jackson, last public hanging in U.S., for murder (21 May 1937)
- Udham Singh, Indian revolutionary (31 July 1940)
- Dietrich Bonhoeffer, German theologian (9 April 1945)
- Irma Grese, German Nazi concentration camp guard and war criminal (13 December 1945)
- William Joyce (Lord Haw-Haw), Nazi propagandist (3 January 1946)
- Tomoyuki Yamashita, Japanese general and war criminal (23 February 1946)
- Amon Göth, Austrian Nazi commandant of the Nazi concentration camp in Płaszów and war criminal (13 September 1946)
- Hans Frank, German Nazi Governor-General of occupied Poland and war criminal (16 October 1946)
- Wilhelm Frick, German Nazi Minister of the Interior, 1933–1943, and war criminal (16 October 1946)
- Alfred Jodl, German Nazi Chief of the Operations Staff of the Oberkommando der Wehrmacht and war criminal (16 October 1946)
- Ernst Kaltenbrunner, Austrian Nazi highest surviving SS leader and war criminal (16 October 1946)
- Wilhelm Keitel, German Nazi head of the Oberkommando der Wehrmacht and war criminal (16 October 1946)
- Joachim von Ribbentrop, German Nazi foreign minister and war criminal (16 October 1946)
- Alfred Rosenberg, German Nazi theorist and propagandist and war criminal (16 October 1946)
- Fritz Sauckel, German Nazi General Plenipotentiary for Labour Deployment and war criminal (16 October 1946)
- Arthur Seyss-Inquart, German Nazi chancellor of Austria, Reichskommissar for the German-occupied Netherlands and war criminal (16 October 1946)
- Julius Streicher, German Nazi founder/publisher of the virulently antisemitic newspaper Der Stürmer and war criminal (16 October 1946)
- Hideki Tōjō, Prime Minister of Japan and war criminal (23 December 1948)
- Yoshio Kodaira, Japanese serial killer (5 October 1949)
- Narayan Apte, executed for his role in the assassination of Mahatma Gandhi (15 November 1949)
- Nathuram Godse, assassin of Mahatma Gandhi (15 November 1949)
- Marguerite "Madame le Corbeau" Pitre, Canadian conspirator in the bombing of Canadian Pacific Flight 108, last woman executed in Canada (9 January 1953)
- Derek Bentley, English man hanged for aiding the murder of a police officer during an attempted robbery (28 January 1953)
- Michael Manning, murderer, the last person executed in the Republic of Ireland (20 April 1954)
- Ruth Ellis, Welsh model, escort and last woman executed in the United Kingdom who was accused and executed for the murder of her lover (13 July 1955)
- Genzo Kurita, Japanese serial killer (14 October 1959)
- Adnan Menderes, Turkish Prime Minister between 1950 and 1960 (17 September 1961)
- Adolf Eichmann, German Nazi major organizer of the Holocaust and war criminal (1 June 1962)
- Arthur Lucas and Ronald Turpin, murderers, executed side by side in the last executions performed in Canada (11 December 1962)
- Richard "Dick" Hickock and Perry Edward Smith, murderers of the Clutter family (14 April 1965)
- Tan Kheng Ann, Chia Yeow Fatt, Cheong Wai Sang, Somasundram s/o Subramaniam, Lim Tee Kang, Somasundarajoo s/o Vengdasalam, Lim Kim Chuan, Khoo Geok San, Chan Wah, Hoe Hock Hai, Ponapalam s/o Govindasamy, Chew Seng Hoe, Chew Thiam Huat, Sim Hoe Seng, Ng Cheng Liong, Tan Yin Chwee, Sim Teck Beng and Cheng Poh Kheng, the eighteen rioters who were convicted of armed rioting and murdering four officers at the island prison of Pulau Senang (29 October 1965)
- Ronald Ryan (murderer), the last person executed in Australia (3 February 1967)
- Sunny Ang, a law student and Prix driver who became the first to be executed for a case of murder without a body in Singapore (6 February 1967)
- Usman bin Haji Muhammad Ali and Harun Thohir, two of the three terrorists responsible for the MacDonald House bombing in Singapore, which killed three people on 10 March 1965 (17 October 1968)
- Lim Heng Soon and Low Ngah Ngah, two Singaporeans found guilty of killing a police detective (after 20 March 1970)
- Akira Nishiguchi, Japanese serial killer (11 December 1970)
- Teo Cheng Leong, Singaporean armed robber (c. May 1971)
- Deniz Gezmiş, Turkish Marxist-Leninist revolutionary and political activist (6 May 1972)
- Liew Kim Siong and Kee Ah Tee, two Singaporean youths found guilty of murdering two Hongkongers at a factory during a robbery attempt (c. 1972)
- Lee Chor Pet, Lim Kim Kwee and Ho Kee Fatt, three kidnappers who abducted and killed Ong Beang Leck, the 19-year-old son of a millionaire (27 January 1973)
- Osman bin Ali, a gardener convicted and hanged for killing a cook and an amah at a bungalow in Leedon Park (27 July 1973)
- Sim Woh Kum, husband and accomplice of Mimi Wong, who murdered a Japanese woman in Singapore (27 July 1973)
- Mimi Wong, the first female prisoner to be executed for murder in Singapore (27 July 1973)
- Chow Kim Hoong, a Malaysian-born stateless person found guilty of the 1969 killing of his brother's fiancée in Singapore (3 August 1973)
- Stephen Francis, Andrew Chou Hock Guan, Peter Lim Swee Guan, David Chou Hock Heng, Richard James, Konesekaram Nagalingam, Alex Yau Hean Thye, seven of the ten murderers involved in the 1971 Gold Bars triple murders (28 February 1975)
- Ismail U. K. Abdul Rahman, a Singaporean labourer who killed a one-armed man Karuppan Velusamy (28 February 1975)
- Chelliah Silvanathan, a Singaporean who stabbed a senior gang member to death (11 April 1975)
- Michael X, black revolutionary, for murder (16 May 1975)
- Neoh Bean Chye and Lim Kim Huat, two Malaysians hanged for shooting and killing wine shop proprietor Chew Liew Tea (27 June 1975)
- Liew Ah Chiew, a Singaporean army conscript convicted of fatally shooting his platoon commander Hor Koon Seng (29 November 1975)
- Kiyoshi Ōkubo, Japanese serial killer (22 January 1976)
- Pehn Kwan Jin, a Singaporean seaman hanged for the murder of a vegetable seller Tan Eng Kim at Bras Basah (16 April 1976)
- K. Vijayan Krishnan, a Malaysian labourer executed for the 1973 murder of Ahora Murthi Krishnasamy (30 April 1976)
- Sha Bakar Dawood, Singaporean seaman and armed robber, the first person executed under the Arms Offences Act of Singapore (3 September 1976)
- Nadarajah Govindasamy, Singaporean businessman who murdered the fiancé of his daughter (28 January 1977)
- Talib Haji Hamzah, a Malaysian soto seller who was found guilty and hanged for being an accomplice of a firearm robbery under the Arms Offences Act (28 January 1977)
- Julio Vargas Garayar, Peruvian Air Force serviceman convicted of spying for Chile. Last person to be executed by Peru. (20 January 1979)
- Zulfikar Ali Bhutto, former Pakistani prime minister (4 April 1979)
- Visuvanathan Thillai Kannu, a Malaysian labourer who murdered a road sweeper (25 May 1979)
- Tay Eng Whatt, an unemployed Singaporean who murdered a call-girl syndicate operator (29 June 1979)
- Chang Bock Eng and Tay Cher Kiang, executed for a 1976 shooting incident at a paint shop in Singapore's Balestier Road (9 May 1980)
- Quek Kee Siong, Singaporean labourer who raped and murdered a ten-year-old girl (after 19 November 1980)
- Botak Chin, real name Wong Swee Chin, Malaysian convicted armed robber executed for the capital crime of possessing a firearm in Malaysia (11 June 1981)
- Low Hong Eng (a Singaporean seamstress) and Tan Ah Tee (a Malaysian illegal taxi driver), both executed for drug trafficking. Low was the first female to be hanged in Singapore for drug trafficking since 1975 (9 October 1981)
- Haw Tua Tau, a Singaporean hawker executed for murdering two hawkers at Margaret Drive Hawker Centre (1982)
- Kalidass Sinnathamby Narayanasamy, a Singaporean army lance corporal executed for molesting and killing his seven-year-old niece Usharani Ganaison (after 17 May 1982)
- Philippa Mdluli, Swazi child killer. She was the last person executed by Eswatini (2 July 1983)
- Yeo Ching Boon, Ong Hwee Kuan and Ong Chin Hock, the three kidnappers and robbers who killed taxi driver Chew Theng Hin and police conscript Lee Kim Lai in two separate cases (24 February 1984)
- Lim Kok Yew, a fugitive and robber who used a firearm while committing the 1979 Tiong Bahru bus hijacking (8 June 1984)
- Kevin John Barlow and Brian Geoffrey Shergold Chambers, the first two Westerners sentenced to death in Malaysia for drug trafficking (7 July 1986)
- Sim Min Teck, one of three perpetrators of the 1980 Jurong fishing port murders (after 7 July 1986)
- Ramu Annadavascan, who killed a man by hitting him with a rake and burning him alive (19 September 1986)
- Lau Ah Kiang, a jobless Singaporean who used a chopper to kill his adoptive niece Ong Ai Siok (after 18 January 1988)
- Adrian Lim, Tan Mui Choo and Hoe Kah Hong, convicted child killers and perpetrators of the 1981 Toa Payoh ritual murders (25 November 1988)
- Sek Kim Wah, former recruit of the Singapore Armed Forces and convicted of robbing and murdering five people in two separate cases (9 December 1988)
- Lau Chi Sing, the first Hong Kong national to be given the death penalty in Singapore for drug trafficking (17 November 1989)
- Teo Boon Ann, a Singaporean temple medium convicted of killing an elderly woman (20 April 1990)
- Lim Beng Hai, a Singaporean drug addict convicted of killing three people during a robbery (5 October 1990)
- Tan Joo Cheng, an unemployed Singaporean and drug addict, convicted of the murder of Lee Juay Heng (c. 1992)
- Ronald Tan Chong Ngee, an unemployed Singaporean, and Lim Joo Yin, a Singaporean contractor, who were caught importing 1.37 kg of heroin (3 April 1992)
- Hensley Anthony Neville, a Eurasian Singaporean who raped and killed 19-year-old interior designer Lim Hwee Huang (28 August 1992)
- Vasavan Sathiadew, who, together with three hired Thai killers, strangled his adoptive brother Frankie Tan to death. He and two of the Thais, Phan Khenapim and Wan Pathong, were hanged the same day. (23 October 1992)
- Chia Chee Yeen, a Singaporean National Serviceman who murdered his army superior (c. 1993)
- Ithinin Kamari, a Singaporean who perpetrated the 1989 Tanglin Halt double murders (c. 1993)
- Loh Yoon Seong, a Malaysian who stabbed to death an Indonesian fish trader (c. 1993)
- Tan Bee Hock, a Singaporean who murdered a games stall owner (c. 1993)
- Westley Allan Dodd, American serial killer and child molester, hanged in the U.S. state of Washington (5 January 1993)
- Mohamed Mahmuduzzaman Khan and Mohamed Bachu Miah, two Bangladeshi immigrants found guilty of murdering a third (23 July 1993)
- Raymond Ko Mun Cheung and An Man Keny Chiu Sum Hing, two labourers from Hong Kong convicted of drug trafficking in Singapore (30 July 1993)
- Maksa Tohaiee, a Singaporean cleaner who was 18 years old when he murdered Italian housewife Clementina Curci during a burglary attempt (26 November 1993)
- Ng Soo Hin, a Singaporean carpenter convicted of killing his girlfriend Foo Chin Chin and another female friend, Ng Lee Kheng (after 4 December 1993)
- Mazlan Maidun, a Singaporean who killed a lorry driver in 1988 (21 January 1994)
- Yeo Watt Song, a Singaporean illegal hawker who murdered his childhood friend in 1989 (March 1994)
- Cheuk Mei Mei and Tse Po Chung, two Hong Kong citizens executed in Singapore for drug trafficking (5 March 1994)
- Krishnan Varadan, a Malaysian who robbed and killed an elderly man in 1984, and also the longest-serving death row prisoner in Singapore at the time he was executed (15 April 1994)
- Charles Rodman Campbell, American murderer, hanged in the U.S. state of Washington (27 May 1994)
- Goh Hong Choon, who killed a young girl during a robbery (29 July 1994)
- Lee Teck Sang, a Singaporean army deserter who killed a lecturer during a robbery attempt at Singapore Polytechnic (29 July 1994)
- Ibrahim Masod, who kidnapped a goldsmith for ransom before killing him (29 July 1994)
- Mohamed Jaafar Abidin and Yacob Rusmatullah, convicted of murdering a 78-year-old housewife (26 August 1994)
- Murgan Ramasamy, convicted of the 1988 murder of a taxi driver (16 September 1994)
- Ong Yeow Tian, who killed a policeman and shot two other officers with a revolver (25 November 1994)
- Elke Tsang Kai-mong, Hong Kong national convicted of trafficking more than 4 kg of diamorphine (16 December 1994)
- Lim Lye Hock, who killed his childhood friend after raping her (c. 1995)
- Daniel Chan Chi-pun, a Hong Kong citizen convicted of heroin trafficking (10 March 1995)
- Flor Contemplacion, Filipina domestic worker convicted of murder in Singapore (17 March 1995)
- Chin Seow Noi, Chin Yaw Kim and Ng Kim Heng, three Malaysians who murdered Lim Lee Tin, the girlfriend of Chin Seow Noi (31 March 1995)
- Tong Ching Man and her boyfriend Lam Cheuk Wang, two Hong Kong citizens executed in Singapore for trafficking a total of 3 kg of heroin (21 April 1995)
- Poon Yuen Chung, a Hong Kong tourist executed in Singapore for trafficking 9.5 kg of heroin (21 April 1995)
- Auto Shankar, Indian serial killer (27 April 1995)
- Kumar Nadison, Jabar Kadermastan and Chandran Gangatharan, three Malaysians convicted of murdering ice factory worker Samynathan Pawathai in 1985 (28 April 1995)
- Oh Laye Koh, a Singaporean school bus driver convicted of murdering 17-year-old Malaysian schoolgirl Liang Shan Shan in 1989. Oh also was alleged to have killed 18-year-old lounge waitress Norhayah Mohamed Ali in 1982. (19 May 1995)
- Jahabar Bagurudeen, an Indian businessman convicted of murdering a moneychanger (2 June 1995)
- Phua Soy Boon, an unemployed Singaporean convicted of killing a moneylender (16 June 1995)
- Mohamad Ashiek Salleh and Junalis Lumat, two unemployed Singaporeans convicted of robbing and killing two taxi drivers (16 June 1995)
- Anbuarsu Joseph, a Singaporean scaffolder and gang leader of Gi Leng Kiat, who murdered a patron of a coffee shop (7 July 1995)
- Sagar Suppiah Retnam, a Singaporean labourer and former gang leader of Ang Soon Tong, who murdered a bystander during a gang clash at Marsiling Singapore (7 July 1995)
- Ng Theng Shuang, a Malaysian armed robber who shot a Cisco officer and two other bystanders during a failed robbery attempt (14 July 1995)
- Jamaludin Ibrahim, a Singaporean repairman convicted of killing his two neighbours during a robbery (28 July 1995)
- S. S. Asokan and Maniam Rathinswamy, two Singaporean security guards convicted of murdering loan shark Tan Heng Hong (8 September 1995)
- Indra Wijaya Ibrahim, a Singaporean drug addict who robbed and murdered an 80-year-old woman inside a lift (29 September 1995)
- Billy Bailey, convicted murderer who was the last prisoner hanged in the U.S., in the state of Delaware (25 January 1996)
- Panya Marmontree, Prawit Yaowabutr, Manit Wangjaisuk, Panya Amphawa, and Prasong Bunsom, five gang robbers convicted of killing three foreign construction workers in Singapore (15 March 1996)
- Rozman Jusoh and Razali Mat Zin, Malaysian odd-job labourers hanged in Singapore for marijuana trafficking (12 April 1996)
- John Martin Scripps, a British spree killer executed in Singapore for killing a South African tourist (19 April 1996)
- Zainal Abidin Abdul Malik, a Singaporean hotel worker who hacked a police officer to death with an axe (30 August 1996)
- Teo Kim Hong, a Singaporean prostitute who murdered her Malaysian friend and colleague Ching Bee Ing (30 August 1996)
- Thongbai Naklangdon, a Thai welder convicted of murdering his friend and co-worker Suk Malasri (30 August 1996)
- Jang Hye-gyung, mother of North Korean defector Shin Dong-hyuk, hanged for attempting to escape Camp 14, a high-security North Korean concentration camp (29 November 1996)
- Pracha Thanomnin, an illegal Thai worker in Singapore convicted of murdering a taxi driver during a robbery attempt (10 January 1997)
- Khampun Sriyotha and Samlee Prathumtree, two Thai workers who murdered their countryman Somwang Yapapha during a sledgehammer attack in Singapore (4 July 1997)
- Lim Chwee Soon, a Singaporean armed robber convicted and sentenced to death under the Arms Offences Act for discharging his firearm seven times during the robbery of a goldsmith (25 July 1997)
- Norio Nagayama, Japanese serial killer (1 August 1997)
- Jimmy Chua Hwa Soon, a former sergeant of the Singapore Armed Forces who murdered his sister-in-law Neo Lam Lye and also heavily slashed his four-year-old nephew (February 1998)
- Asogan Ramesh Ramachandren and Selvar Kumar Silvaras, two Singaporeans who killed a gangster. Their fellow murderer Mathavakannan Kalimuthu was granted clemency and re-sentenced to life imprisonment. (29 May 1998)
- Lim Chin Chong, a Malaysian male prostitute who, at age 18, murdered his employer Philip Low Cheng Quee, who operated a male brothel (23 October 1998)
- Jonaris Badlishah, a Malaysian and distant nephew of the then-Sultan of Kedah, who murdered a beautician after he robbed her of her Rolex watch (February 1999)
- Gerardine Andrew, Nazar Mohamed Kassim, and Mansoor Abdullah, who were responsible for the murder of Sivapackiam Veerappan Rengasamy (26 February 1999)
- Too Yin Sheong, a Malaysian who was one of three robbers who committed the murder of Lee Kok Cheong (30 April 1999)
- Norishyam Mohamed Ali and Shaiful Edham Adam, two Singaporeans convicted of killing a Bulgarian student (2 July 1999)
- S. Nagarajan Kuppusamy, a Singaporean lorry driver convicted of murdering a prison warden (23 July 1999)
- Lau Lee Peng, a Singaporean fishmonger who robbed and murdered his long-time friend and fruit stall helper Lily Tan Eng Yan at her Tampines flat (1 September 2000)
- Chan Chim Yee, a Singaporean cleaner and ex-seaman who murdered his girlfriend (15 September 2000)
- Kiyotaka Katsuta, Japanese serial killer (30 November 2000)
- Julaiha Begum, a Singaporean Indian executed for soliciting the murder of her husband T. Maniam, a retired policeman. Her accomplices Loganatha Venkatesan and Chandran Rajagopal were executed at the same time. (16 February 2001)
- Zainuzzaman Mohamad Jasadi, a Malaysian who murdered a famous children's television host, Intan Yusniza Mohamad Yunos, and her foster mother Haniza Ismail at Kuala Lumpur in 1991 (5 October 2001)
- Tay Chin Wah, a Singaporean taxi driver who was convicted of shooting at a moneylender, who survived. Tay was convicted and sentenced to death under the Arms Offences Act for illegally discharging his firearm with intent to cause harm. (26 October 2001)
- Mona Fandey, Malaysian pop singer convicted of murdering Malaysian politician Mazlan bin Idris. Her husband Mohamad Nor Affandi bin Abdul Rahman and her assistant Juraimi bin Hassan were also sentenced to death and executed on the same day as her (2 November 2001)
- Khwan-On Natthaphon, a Thai carpenter convicted of murdering a taxi driver (27 September 2002)
- Rosli Ahmat, Wan Kamil Mohamed Shafian and Ibrahim Mohamed, three Singaporean robbers convicted of robbing and killing taxi driver Koh Ngiap Yong and moneychanger Jahabar Sathick (25 October 2002)
- Anthony Ler, full name Anthony Ler Wee Teang, a Singaporean graphic designer who hired and manipulated a 15-year-old male minor to murder his 30-year-old wife Annie Leong Wai Mun (or Annie Leong), who was in the process of divorcing him. Ler was sentenced to death while his 15-year-old accomplice was spared the death sentence and instead sentenced to indefinite detention at the President's Pleasure (13 December 2002)
- Ariffin Agas, a Malaysian security guard convicted of murdering two Indian-American brothers and their Filipina maid in 1992 (27 December 2002)
- Kanesan Ratnam, a Singaporean convicted of murdering a fellow prisoner at Queenstown Remand Prison (10 January 2003)
- Seethong Phichet, Thongthot Yordsa-Art and Dornchinnamat Yingyos, three Thai workers convicted of killing a drug lord (21 February 2003)
- Vignes Mourthi and Moorthy Angappan, two Malaysian drug traffickers convicted of importing 27.65 grams of diamorphine (26 September 2003)
- Arun Prakash Vaithilingam, an Indian ship electrician convicting of murdering his colleague inside their rented flat in Marsiling, Singapore (3 October 2003)
- Yen May Woen, a Singaporean hairdresser convicted of trafficking 30.16g of diamorphine (19 March 2004)
- Jin Yugang, a Chinese cleaner convicted of murdering a compatriot in Singapore (19 March 2004)
- Soosainathan Dass Saminathan, a Singaporean convicted of the rape and murder of a six-month-old baby girl (21 May 2004)
- Tan Chee Wee, a Malaysian convicted of the rape-murder of a Thai housewife in Singapore (11 June 2004)
- Dhananjoy Chatterjee, an Indian convicted of the rape and murder of a 14-year-old girl (14 August 2004)
- Mamoru Takuma, Japanese mass murderer (14 September 2004)
- Zailani Ahmad, a technician convicted of killing a caretaker (c. 2005)
- Harith Gary Lee, a Singaporean convicted of murdering his girlfriend (22 April 2005)
- Van Tuong Nguyen, Australian drug trafficker (2 December 2005)
- Khor Kok Soon, one of Singapore's top ten fugitives, caught and convicted of the 1984 Shenton Way shooting and murder of a lorry driver (c. 2006)
- Lim Thian Lai, a Singaporean gunman who shot and murdered a businessman in 1997 (c. 2006)
- Tony Koh Zhan Quan and Lim Poh Lye, both convicted of murdering scrap car dealer Bock Tuan Thong (28 April 2006)
- Zahit Muslim, Jamaluddin Darus and Jemari Jusoh, three members of Al-Ma'unah convicted of waging war against the King of Malaysia during the Sauk Siege (28 July 2006)
- Mohamed Amin Mohamed Razali, the principal member of Al-Ma'unah, convicted of waging war against the King of Malaysia during the Sauk Siege (4 August 2006)
- Took Leng How, a Malaysian who murdered Huang Na, an 8-year-old Chinese citizen, in Pasir Panjang, Singapore (3 November 2006)
- Saddam Hussein, President of Iraq and war criminal (30 December 2006)
- Barzan Ibrahim al-Tikriti, half-brother of Saddam Hussein, leader of the Mukhabarat, decapitated due to the wrong measurements of the rope (15 January 2007)
- Leong Siew Chor, a Singaporean who murdered his lover and dismembered her body into seven pieces (30 November 2007)
- Tsutomu Miyazaki, a Japanese serial killer who murdered four young girls between August 1988 and June 1989 (17 June 2008)
- Hanafi Mat Hassan, a bus driver convicted of the 2000 rape and murder of Noor Suzaily Mukhtar in Malaysia (19 December 2008)
- Mohammed Ali bin Johari, a Singaporean Malay who raped and killed his stepdaughter Nurasyura binte Mohamed Fauzi, who was nicknamed "Nonoi", for which the crime made headlines in Singapore (19 December 2008)
- Abdul Malik bin Usman, Kamal bin Kupli and Hamir Hasim, three Malaysians found guilty of murdering a Burmese worker during a robbery (c. 2008)
- Tan Chor Jin, a former fugitive and gangster who was responsible for the fatal shooting of nightclub owner Lim Hock Soon (9 January 2009)
- Ali Hassan al-Majid, chief of the Iraqi Intelligence Service, military commander, cousin of Saddam Hussein, and war criminal (25 January 2010)
- Tharema Vejayan Govindasamy, a Singaporean odd-job worker who murdered his ex-wife in 2007 (c. 2011)
- Zar Ajam, a Pakistani teenager who committed a terrorist attack in Afghanistan. (20 June 2011)
- Zahra Bahrami, a Dutch-Iranian dual citizen, convicted of narcotics trafficking (29 January 2011)
- Nakamuthu Balakrishnan, a Singaporean who murdered a lorry driver during a S$1.3 million mobile phone heist (8 July 2011)
- Ajmal Kasab, a Pakistani militant and member of the Lashkar-e-Taiba Islamist group, convicted in the 2008 Mumbai attacks (21 November 2012)
- Afzal Guru, Indian convicted in the 2001 Indian Parliament attack (9 February 2013)
- Abdul Quader Molla, Bangladeshi Islamist leader and politician of the Bangladesh Jamaat-e-Islami, convicted of rape and mass murder (12 December 2013)
- Wang Zhijian, a Chinese convicted of murdering three women in a rental HDB flat in Yishun, Singapore. (after 28 November 2014)
- Muhammad Kadar, a Singaporean odd-job labourer who killed an elderly housewife by inflicting 110 knife wounds on her during a robbery in 2005 (17 April 2015)
- Tsukasa Kanda, a Japanese criminal and one of three culprits in the murder of Rie Isogai. One of his accomplices was sentenced to life imprisonment while another was sentenced to death for an unrelated murder case (25 June 2015)
- Yakub Memon, Indian citizen convicted of involvement in the 1993 Bombay bombings. (30 July 2015)
- Kho Jabing, a Malaysian responsible for the robbery and murder of Chinese national and construction worker Cao Ruyin in Singapore in 2008. (20 May 2016)
- Hassan Afshar, an Iranian teenage boy who was convicted of raping another teenage boy. Afshar maintained that the sexual act was consented. (18 July 2016)
- Ahmad Najib bin Aris, a Malaysian who abducted, raped and murdered 32-year-old Canny Ong in 2003, a case that made shocked headlines in Malaysia (23 September 2016)
- Masakatsu Nishikawa, a Japanese serial killer responsible for five murders of bar hostesses (13 July 2017)
- Rasheed Muhammad and Ramzan Rizwan, two Pakistani tissue paper sellers who killed and dismembered their Pakistani roommate (c. 2018)
- Shoko Asahara, founder of the Japanese doomsday cult Aum Shinrikyo and mastermind behind the Tokyo subway sarin attack in 1995. (6 July 2018)
- Kazuaki Okazaki, a Japanese killer, and his accomplice, Satoro Hashimoto, who committed the Sakamoto family murders in 1989; Okazaki committed several other murders as well (26 July 2018)
- Chia Kee Chen, a Singaporean businessman who murdered his wife's lover Dexmon Chua Yizhi. Originally sentenced to life imprisonment; the sentence was increased to the death penalty by the Court of Appeal. (after 27 July 2018)
- Micheal Anak Garing, a Malaysian who robbed and murdered 41-year-old Shanmuganathan Dillidurai during the last of his group's serial armed robbery spree in Kallang, Singapore. (22 March 2019)
- Wei Wei, a Japan-based Chinese student and one of three perpetrators of the 2003 Fukuoka family murders, in which Shinjiro Matsumoto and his family died. One of Wei's two accomplices, who both fled to China, was sentenced to life imprisonment there while another was executed in 2005 (26 December 2019)
- Pawan Gupta, Mukesh Singh, Vinay Sharma and Akshay Thakur, the four adult rapists and murderers in the 2012 Delhi gang rape and murder (20 March 2020)
- Abdul Kahar Othman, a 68-year-old Singaporean drug trafficker who was the first to be executed during the COVID-19 pandemic in Singapore (30 March 2022)
- Nagaenthran K. Dharmalingam, a Malaysian executed in Singapore despite his alleged intellectual disability and the resulting international outcry (27 April 2022)
- Norasharee Gous (a Singaporean) and Kalwant Singh Jogindar Singh a Singaporean and a Malaysian, respectively, convicted of heroin trafficking (7 July 2022)
- Nazeri Lajim, a Singaporean former drug addict convicted of heroin trafficking (22 July 2022)
- Tomohiro Katō, a Japanese mass killer who committed the 2008 Akihabara massacre (26 July 2022)
- Abdul Rahim Shapiee and Ong Seow Ping, two Singaporeans convicted of heroin trafficking (5 August 2022)
- Tangaraju Suppiah, a Singaporean convicted of marijuana trafficking (26 April 2023)
- Saridewi Djamani, a Singaporean convicted of diamorphine trafficking (28 July 2023)
- Mohamed Shalleh Abdul Latiff, a Singaporean convicted of diamorphine trafficking (3 August 2023)
- Ahmed Salim, a Bangladeshi painter who murdered his ex-fiancée in Singapore (28 February 2024)
- Roslan Bakar and Pausi Jefridin, a Singaporean and a Malaysian, respectively, convicted of drug trafficking (15 November 2024)
- Rosman Abdullah, a Singaporean convicted of diamorphine trafficking (22 November 2024)
- Iskandar Rahmat, a Singaporean ex-policeman hanged for the 2013 Kovan double murders (5 February 2025)
- Roshdi Abdullah Altway, a Singaporean convicted of drug trafficking (10 April 2025)
- Teo Ghim Heng, a Singaporean ex-property agent who murdered his daughter and pregnant wife (16 April 2025)
- Takahiro Shiraishi, a Japanese convicted serial killer (27 June 2025)

== Accidental hanging ==
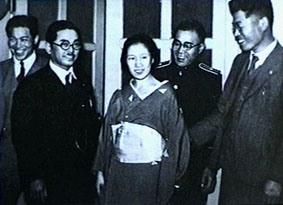
Newspaper photo taken shortly after the arrest of Sada Abe (center) in Tokyo in 1936

- Frantisek Kotzwara (1730–1791), Czech violinist composer, died during erotic asphyxiation
- Albert Dekker (1905–1968), American actor, found dead in his bathroom with a noose around his neck, looped around the shower curtain rod.
- Sada Abe (1905–after 1971), Japanese geisha killed her lover through strangulation while he was sleeping, after having experimented with erotic asphyxiation, in 1936, proceeding to cut off his penis and testicles and carry them around with her in her kimono for three days.
- Nigel Tetley (c. 1924–1972), British sailor who was the first person to circumnavigate the world solo in a trimaran; his body was found hanging from a tree, clothed in lingerie, considered by the pathologist to have been engaging in masochistic sexual activity.
- Vaughn Bodē (1941–1975), American artist, died during autoerotic asphyxiation
- Diane Herceg sued Hustler magazine in 1983, accusing it of causing the death of her 14-year-old son, who had experimented with autoerotic asphyxia after reading about it in the publication. His nude body was found hanging in his closet with a noose around his neck. Spread at his feet was a copy of Hustler opened to its article on "Orgasm of Death."
- Stephen Milligan (1948–1994), British politician and Conservative MP for Eastleigh, died from autoerotic asphyxiation, wearing only stockings and suspenders.
- Kevin Gilbert (1966–1996), musician and songwriter, died of apparent autoerotic asphyxiation
- David Carradine (1936–2009), American actor, died from accidental asphyxiation, according to medical examiner who performed a private autopsy. His body was found hanging by a rope in a closet in his hotel room in Thailand, and there was evidence of a recent orgasm. Two autopsies were conducted and concluded his death was not suicide. The Thai forensic pathologist who examined his body stated his death may have been due to autoerotic asphyxiation. Two of Carradine's ex-wives, Gail Jensen and Marina Anderson, stated publicly that his sexual interests included the practice of self-bondage.

== Homicidal hanging ==
- Alexis Latimer and Sheri Clark, two teenage girls abducted and murdered by serial killer Richard Valenti, who tied them up and hanged them in 1973. Valenti died in 2020 while serving a life sentence for their deaths.
