= Miyu Uehara =

Japanese model and TV personality (1987-2011)

- Born: Mutsumi Fujisaki; 2 May 1987; Tanegashima, Japan
- Died: 12 May 2011 (aged 24); Tokyo, Japan
- Occupations: Gravure idol; tarento
- Years active: 2009–2011

Mutsumi Fujisaki (藤崎 睦美, Fujisaki Mutsumi; 2 May 1987 – 12 May 2011), better known as Miyu Uehara (上原 美優, Uehara Miyu), was a Japanese gravure idol and tarento.

== Early life ==
Uehara was born Mutsumi Fujisaki on the island of Tanegashima on 2 May 1987. She had nine older siblings, and briefly attended high school in Kagoshima before dropping out.

== Career ==
Uehara moved to Tokyo at the age of 17 and began glamour modeling while working as a hostess at a kyabakura. She soon established herself as a gravure idol and tarento, and came to be known as a "poverty idol" because of her poor background. After featuring on the cover of Weekly Playboy, she released her first photobook, Hare Tokidoki Namida (lit. "Fair, then Occasional Tears") in July 2009. She had appeared in a total of 445 television programs and two television commercials by May 2011, and was represented by Platinum Production.

== Death ==
In the early hours of 12 May 2011, at the age of 24, Uehara took her own life via hanging at her apartment in the Meguro ward of Tokyo. Police reported that no suicide note was found and that some scribbled messages were discovered nearby, but it was not possible to ascertain whether she wrote them as they were illegible.

== Works ==
=== Films ===
- Yatterman (2009)

=== Books ===
- 10-nin Kyōdai Binbō Aidoru - Watashi, Ikenai Shōjo Dattan Deshōka? (１０人兄弟貧乏アイドル☆私、イケナイ少女だったんでしょうか？) (May 2009, Poplar; ISBN 978-4-591-10965-6)

== See also ==
- List of people who died by hanging
