= Charlie Brandt =

American serial killer (1957–2004)

- Born: Carl Eric Brandt; February 23, 1957; Connecticut, U.S.
- Died: September 13, 2004 (aged 47); Maitland, Florida, U.S.
- Cause of death: Suicide by hanging
- Motive: Unclear (Note: Brandt seemed unable to fully explain the 1971 shooting of his parents, saying to an investigator that it was “A combination of things. A lot of work, tests to make up. I had to make up my interim card. Everything sort of snapped in my mind. I felt like I never felt before” and that “It was like I was sort of programmed to do it. I hesitated, but the next thing I knew, I had shot them”; three separate psychological evaluations failed to establish a solid motive. Evidence found in his home and on his computer after his death suggested that he had an obsession with human anatomy, but why he murdered Sherry Perisho; his wife Teri; his niece Michelle; and likely other women remains uncertain.)

Details
- Victims: 4 confirmed, 7-30+ suspected
- Span of crimes: January 3, 1971 – September 13, 2004
- Country: United States
- States: Indiana, Florida (confirmed)

Carl Eric "Charlie" Brandt (February 23, 1957 – September 13, 2004) was an American serial killer known to have perpetrated at least four murders. In 1971, at age 13, Brandt shot his parents in their family home in Fort Wayne, Indiana, killing his pregnant mother and wounding his father. He spent one year at a psychiatric hospital before being released and was never criminally charged. On September 13, 2004, Brandt stabbed his wife and niece to death and then hanged himself in his niece's garage in Maitland, Florida.

This incident, Brandt's efficiency in killing his wife and niece, and his hidden obsession with human anatomy led investigators to look into the possibility that he had committed other murders since moving to Florida in 1973. The 1989 murder of a homeless woman near Brandt's home in the Florida Keys was solved as a result of the investigation, as he was found to have been the perpetrator. Police suspect him in three other Florida murders, but his true number of victims could potentially be up to or exceeding thirty.

== Early life ==
Carl Eric Brandt was born on February 23, 1957, to Herbert and Ilsa Brandt, first-generation German immigrants who had settled in the United States in 1955. Brandt's parents had originally settled in Texas before moving to Connecticut, where Brandt was born as the couple's second child. He had an older sister, Angela, and two younger sisters, Jessica and Melanie.

Although regarded as a good student, Brandt was shy and had difficulty adjusting to new surroundings. His family moved frequently due to Herbert's employment by International Harvester, which included promotions to draftsman and project engineer; Brandt and his siblings attended several different schools as a result. In September 1968, when Brandt was aged 11, Herbert was transferred to the company's plant in Fort Wayne, Indiana. The family frequently vacationed in Florida, where Brandt hunted small game with his father.

== Murders ==
=== 1971 murders ===
On January 3, 1971, Brandt and his family had returned to their Fort Wayne residence the previous night following their annual Christmas vacation in Ormond Beach, Florida. After the children had turned in for the evening, Herbert was shaving in the bathroom while Ilsa, eight months pregnant, was taking a bath while reading Time magazine. Brandt, then aged 13, abruptly walked into the bathroom and shot both parents at point blank range with his father's 9mm handgun, which he had taken from a nightstand drawer. His father survived, but his mother and the fetus were killed instantly.

Brandt then entered the bedroom of his older sister Angela and attempted to shoot her, but his gun would not fire. After a physical struggle, Angela managed to calm her brother by promising that she would help him figure out what to do. She eventually convinced Brandt to go upstairs to retrieve blankets for their infant sisters, who were unharmed, before fleeing the house and seeking help from neighbors. After pursuing his terrified sister outside, Brandt knocked on a neighbor's door, telling her, "I just shot my mom and dad." Herbert later identified his son as his attacker.

After the shooting, Brandt had told Angela that he could not remember what he had done. Angela described her brother as being in a trance-like state, which had broken during their struggle. Upon being interviewed by police, Brandt attributed the shooting to "a combination of things" related to school, stating that, "Everything sort of just snapped in my mind. I felt like I never felt before." Brandt also alluded to an incident that took place a few days before the shooting, near the end of his family's vacation in Florida, in which Herbert had shot and killed their dog while the two were hunting.

Three separate psychiatric evaluations failed to determine what triggered the shooting. Because he was too young to be tried for murder under Indiana law, Brandt spent one year at a psychiatric hospital in Indianapolis before being released back into the custody of his family in June 1972. The family never spoke of the incident again. Until 2004, Brandt's two younger sisters had lived under the impression that their mother had been killed in a car accident.

=== Relocation to Florida ===
Shortly after Brandt's release, his family relocated to Ormond Beach, Florida. One year later, his father (who had remarried) and two younger sisters moved back to Indiana, while Brandt and Angela stayed behind in the care of their grandparents. In 1984, Brandt received a degree in electronics and became a radar specialist for Ford Aerospace in Astor, Florida. Two years later he married Theresa "Teri" Helfrich, the owner of a retail store in Daytona Beach. No relatives were invited to their wedding. The couple built and settled in a $600,000 beach house on Big Pine Key in 1989.

Brandt's sister Angela had advised him to tell Teri about the murder of their mother; although he told them he would take their advice, it is unclear whether he ever did. Notations in Teri's daily planner circa 1993 alluded to puzzling behavior by Brandt such as depressive episodes and "weird talk." Teri also confided in her brother-in-law that she had suspected Brandt in the 1989 killing of Sherry Perisho, reportedly stating that Brandt had come home with blood on his shirt, which he claimed was from filleting fish, on the night of the murder.

=== Sherry Perisho killing ===
On July 16, 1989, the partially-clothed body of Sherry Perisho (38) was discovered floating near Big Pine Key's North Pine Channel Bridge, where she had lived on a dinghy. Perisho's throat had been slashed to the point of near-decapitation, her body was extensively mutilated and her heart was removed. The body was found less than 1,000 feet (300 m) from Brandt's beach house, and Brandt matched a composite sketch of a man seen crossing U.S. Route 1 near the murder scene. Based on this evidence and Teri's reported statements, Monroe County investigators determined that Brandt killed Perisho and officially closed the case on May 6, 2006.

=== 2004 murder–suicide ===
On September 2, 2004, Brandt and Teri evacuated from their beach house ahead of Hurricane Ivan. Their niece, Michelle Lynn Jones, invited them to stay at her residence in Maitland, Florida, a suburb of Orlando. Throughout the visit, Jones kept in regular contact with her mother, Mary Lou, as well as several friends. On the evening of September 13, one of Jones' friends, Lisa Emmons, was scheduled to visit her house. However, Jones discouraged her from coming, saying that the Brandts had an argument after drinking.

On September 15, another one of Jones' friends, Debbie Knight, went to her house to perform a welfare check while on the phone with Jones' mother. After finding the front door locked, Knight tried to enter the house through the garage, where she found Brandt's decomposing body hanging from the rafters; he had hanged himself using bedsheets. Knight contacted police, who entered the house and found the bodies of Brandt's wife and niece. Teri had been stabbed seven times in the chest while lying on a couch. Jones, whose body was found lying on her bed, had been decapitated and disemboweled, with her heart and organs removed, and her head placed next to her body. The weapons used in the crimes had been knives from Jones' kitchen.

Following the discovery of the bodies, a search of Brandt's residence on Big Pine Key revealed that he was a monthly subscriber to Victoria's Secret catalogs, had an extensive collection of surgery-themed books, posters and clippings, and regularly searched online for autopsy photos and snuff film websites depicting violence against women. Police determined that Brandt's efficiency in his murder of Jones indicated past experience, and because he traveled often due to his job, police checked cold cases in Florida that matched his apparent modus operandi. They also launched requests for similar inquiries in the U.S. and abroad. The investigation uncovered evidence conclusively linking Brandt to the 1989 murder of Sherry Perisho.

== Further investigation and other possible murders ==
Ultimately, the search prompted police to reinvestigate unsolved murders in Florida dating back to 1973 for potential evidence of Brandt's involvement. Aside from the 1989 Perisho murder, there was not enough evidence to conclusively link him to other crimes. However, three cases that were determined to have been of particular interest were:

- 1978: Carol Sullivan, aged 12. Sullivan was abducted from a school bus stop in Volusia County on September 20. Her skull was found in a bucket, leading authorities to presume she was murdered and decapitated. Brandt was 21 and lived in Volusia County at the time, but could not be tied to the crime in any other way.
- 1988: Lisa Saunders, aged 20. Saunders was beaten, stabbed and dragged from her car in Big Pine Key in December 1988. Her heart was missing when she was found, but it is unclear if it was extracted by an attacker or eaten by wildlife.
- 1995: Darlene Toler, aged 38. Toler was a Miami resident whose body, missing its head and heart, was wrapped in plastic and blankets, and discovered dumped in a grassy area near a highway. Brandt used the same highway regularly and he kept a mileage record of his travels, which shows an entry for 100 miles (160 km) on the day of her murder, roughly the driving distance between Big Pine Key and the area of Miami where Toler's body was found.

== See also ==
- List of serial killers in the United States
- List of serial killers by number of victims
- List of people who died by suicide by hanging
