= Murder of Sukarti Amari =

1991 case of an elderly woman killed by two robbers in Singapore

- Date: 12 February 1991
- Location: Telok Blangah, Singapore
- Motive: Robbery
- Deaths: Sukarti Amari, 78
- Convicted: Yacob Rusmatullah, 34; Mohamed Jaafar Abidin, 29
- Sentence: Death penalty (Yacob and Jaafar)

Sukarti Amari, the 78-year-old housewife found murdered in her flat.

On 12 February 1991, a 78-year-old housewife, Sukarti binti Amari, was found murdered inside her Telok Blangah flat by her nephew and husband. Her eight rings, gold chains and other jewellery worth S$5,000 were missing from the flat. Two suspects were arrested at least three months later for Sukarti's murder. It was established that both the killers had planned to enter Sukarti's flat to commit robbery, and they devised using chilli powder to blind the deceased before restraining her and strangling her.

Although the two defendants - 34-year-old Yacob s/o Rusmatullah and 29-year-old Mohamed Jaafar bin Abidin (who were both Singaporeans) - argued that there was no intention to strangle Sukarti other than to rob, the High Court found that both Yacob and Jaafar had intentionally strangled the victim with the view to cause her death by asyphxia and therefore, both men were found guilty of the murder, and sentenced to death on 13 April 1993. The Sukarti murderers were both hanged on 26 August 1994 after their appeals against the death sentence failed.

== Murder ==
On the evening of 12 February 1991, at Singapore's Telok Blangah, a 65-year-old cleaner returned home only to find that his front door was locked. Unable to open the door, the cleaner went to one of the nearby blocks, where his nephew lived, so as to seek the nephew's help to open the door. The 48-year-old nephew used a hammer to force open the door (which took three hours or so), and upon entering the flat, both the nephew and his uncle were shocked to see the lifeless body of his aunt lying near to the front door.

The victim was identified as 78-year-old Sukarti binti Amari, a housewife who was nicknamed "Walking jewellery shop" by her neighbours due to her possession of a large amount of valuables and herself wearing the jewellery whenever going outside. Sukarti was speculated to have known her assailant(s), because there were no signs of forced entry into the flat and based on the traces of chilli powder discovered on the victim's face, it was theorized that Sukarti must have opened the door to allow the assailant(s) to enter her house before getting blinded by chilli powder, and later strangled to death. The possible motive for the murder was robbery, since eight rings, two gold chains, two gold bracelets and a pair of gold earrings worth S$5,000 were missing from the flat.

Three months later, on 4 May 1991, the police managed to identify a suspect and arrested him for killing Sukarti. Soon after the first suspect's arrest, his alleged accomplice was found to be detained at a drug rehabilitation centre at Sembawang. Subsequently, the second suspect was also taken into police custody for killing 78-year-old Sukarti Amari. The first suspect, an 34-year-old odd-job worker Yacob Rusmatullah, was charged with murder on 6 May 1991, while the second suspect, 29-year-old Mohamed Jaafar Abidin (unemployed), was charged on 7 May the next day for murder. Under the Penal Code of Singapore, offenders found guilty of murder would be sentenced to death.

== Background ==
Yacob s/o Rusmatullah, one of the two suspects accused of murdering Sukarti Amari

Mohamed Jaafar bin Abidin, one of the two suspects accused of murdering Sukarti Amari

Sukarti binti Amari, an Indonesian-born Singaporean, was born in 1913. She married her Indonesian-born husband Karnawi bin Kaliman (who was 13 years younger than her) sometime in the 1950s when he immigrated from Indonesia to Singapore. Prior to his marriage with Sukarti, Karnawi was previously married to an unknown woman back in Indonesia during the 1940s. Sukarti and her husband had no children, but they had a nephew who lived near them in Telok Blangah, Singapore. Sukarti was a housewife while her husband worked as a cleaner. It was reported that eight months after the death of his wife, Karnawi married for the third time with an Indonesian woman and moved on with his life, but he still missed Sukarti.

According to sources, one of the suspects Mohamed Jaafar Abidin, who was the eldest of seven children in the family, was constantly in and out of drug rehabilitation centres for drug consumption. Jaafar's parents divorced when he was young, and they were remarried at the time their eldest son was charged with murder. Jaafar, who shared a flat with two of his brothers, was unemployed and unable to find a stable job as a result of his addiction and stints at the drug rehabilitation centre, and had to depend on the allowance provided by his siblings and relatives.

The other suspect, Yacob Rusmatullah, was married with five children (aged between six and eleven as of 1993) since 1980. Prior to his latest arrest for murder, Yacob had been imprisoned thrice for other offences. While his criminal record was not entirely known, a 1975 newspaper article revealed that Yacob, then 18 years old, was one of the five teenage convicts (aged between 17 and 21) responsible for robbing two men of their cash, gold necklace and watch. In this case, all five robbers were sentenced to a total of twelve years' imprisonment and 52 strokes of the cane; Yacob's actual sentence out of the five was two years' imprisonment and ten strokes of the cane. Yacob's two other offences were not known, although it was known that his third period of incarceration was six months' imprisonment in 1990. Like Jaafar, Yacob was also a drug addict who constantly serve time at drug rehabilitation centres, and his wife tried to persuade him to give up on drugs. Yacob had worked as a cleaner, general worker and security guard, but he did not have a permanent job due to his antecedents for drug consumption.

== Murder trial and sentencing ==
On 22 March 1993, both Mohamed Jaafar Abidin and Yacob Rusmatullah were brought to trial at the High Court for the charge of murdering Sukarti binti Amari. Sheik Mustafa Abu Hassan and Shanti Abdul Ghani were assigned to prosecute both Yacob and Jaafar for murder, and Yacob was represented by both N. Ganesan and Francis Xavier while Jaafar was defended by both Anthony Lim and Michael Teo. The trial was presided by Judicial Commissioner (JC) Amarjeet Singh of the High Court.

It was the prosecution's case that both Yacob and Jaafar had the plan to enter the flat of Sukarti to commit robbery. Based on the men's statements, the two men devised a plan to make Sukarti open the door and they would use chilli powder to blind the elderly woman's eyes, before they use raffia string to tie up and gag Sukarti. This plan was first conceived by Jaafar, who happened to be at the same block visiting his mother the day before the murder when he chanced upon Sukarti, and witnessed the elderly woman draped in numerous gold valuables. Jaafar thus discussed the plan with Yacob, and they agreed to do so.

In their statements and defence, both Jaafar and Yacob stated that they never intended to strangle Sukarti to death. Both recounted that after they entered the flat and threw the chilli powder into Sukarti's eyes, they forced the victim back inside the flat, and while Sukarti put up a fierce struggle, Jaafar and Yacob used the raffia string to tie up Sukarti, and even looped another around Sukarti's mouth. During the struggle however, the string somehow slipped around Sukarti's neck, and the two men claimed that they had accidentally used too much force, and thus Sukarti fell unconscious as a result of suffocation. While the men fingered each other as the one who truly strangled the victim while claiming their real roles were merely confined to ransacking the flat, both Jaafar and Yacob said that the victim was alive at the time they left the flat with her jewellery (which were all pawned but later recovered by the police). Aside from this, the court heard from Dr Wee Keng Poh, the forensic pathologist, that based on his autopsy of the victim, he determined that Sukarti died within five minutes of the strangulation, because the string was tightly wound and knotted around the neck with great force that this resulted in Sukarti dying from asphyxia due to strangulation around her neck.

On 13 April 1993, Judicial Commissioner (JC) Amarjeet Singh, the trial judge, delivered his verdict. In his judgement, JC Singh ruled that based on the evidence presented before him, he was satisfied beyond a reasonable doubt that based on the prosecution's arguments, both Jaafar and Yacob had intentionally strangled the 78-year-old victim Sukarti binti Amari to death, which was the resultant of the strangulation. JC Singh also found that both men had the common intention to intrude Sukarti's flat with an attempt to rob her, and in furtherance of the intention, they strangled the victim to death. Therefore, both 35-year-old Yacob Rusmatullah and 30-year-old Mohamed Jaffar Abidin were found guilty of murder, and sentenced to death. Reportedly, Jaafar and Yacob were motionless and calm when sentence was pronounced, but their mothers cried openly at the verdict.

== Executions of convicts ==
After the end of their murder trial, both Yacob and Jaafar appealed against their convictions and sentences. Both the men's lawyers, Michael Khoo and James Masih, argued in the appeal that their clients did not intend to strangle Sukarti and only meant to rob her, citing an unrelated, yet similar case where two youths strangled a Filipino maid during a burglary but were both jailed for manslaughter. However, on 25 March 1994, the Court of Appeal's three judges - S. Rajendran, L P Thean and Warren Khoo - ruled in their verdict that there was no doubt that in contrast to the other case where the boys unintentionally strangled the maid while trying to tie her up, both Yacob and Jaafar in this case had the clear intention to strangle the victim and in turn, cause her to die from suffocation. Therefore, the appeals of both Jaafar and Yacob were dismissed.

Subsequently, both the offenders of the Sukarti murder case petitioned for clemency per their final bid to escape the gallows. However, then President of Singapore Ong Teng Cheong decided to, on the advice of the Cabinet, reject the two men's clemency appeal.

On 26 August 1994, 32-year-old Mohamed Jaffar Abidin and 37-year-old Yacob Rusmatullah were hanged at Changi Prison. On the same date at the same prison, a third convict, a 28-year-old Nigerian drug trafficker Emmanuel Anyanwu, was put to death at the same timing as both Jaafar and Yacob.

== See also ==
- Capital punishment in Singapore
