= Murder of D. Munusamy =

1968 murder of a police detective in Singapore

D. Munusamy
- D. Munusamy, the 24-year-old police detective who was stabbed to death
- Born: Munusamy Naidu s/o Doresamy; 1944; Singapore
- Died: 5 February 1968 (aged 23); Bukit Timah, Singapore
- Cause of death: Murdered
- Other names: D. Munisamy; Monisamy s/o Doresamy
- Occupation: Police officer
- Employer: Singapore Police Force (1963 – 1968)
- Known for: Murder victim
- Title: Detective
- Children: None

On 5 February 1968, a 24-year-old police detective named D. Munusamy was stabbed by a group of men nearby a telephone booth at Bukit Timah Road in Singapore, after he tried to arrest one of the men on suspicion of being a gang member, which led to the man's friends attacking the policeman, who managed to fire three rounds, injuring one of them. Detective Munusamy sustained seven stab wounds and collapsed on the road, while the gang members escaped with his revolver.

Detective Munusamy died in the hospital, and subsequently, the police managed to arrest the suspects behind the murder, although in the end, only two of the suspects, Lim Heng Soon (Chinese: 林兴顺; Pe̍h-ōe-jī: Lîm Heng-sūn) and Low Ngah Ngah (Chinese: 刘雅雅; Pe̍h-ōe-jī: Lâu Ngá-ngá), were formally charged and found guilty of murder, and sentenced to death. A third member, Quek Hock Bee (Chinese: 郭福美; Pe̍h-ōe-jī: Koeh Hok-bí), was initially charged with murder before he received a discharge not amounting to an acquittal.

== Murder ==
On the night of 5 February 1968, 24-year-old police detective D. Munusamy, who first joined the Singapore Police Force as a constable five years before in 1963, arrested a suspected secret society gang member outside an open-air cinema along Anamalai Avenue, after he responded to the report of the presence of a gang clash around the area. Detective Munusamy brought the man to a telephone booth along Bukit Timah Road, where he intended to call for reinforcements.

Unknown to Detective Munusamy however, he was stalked by the gang member's four friends. Just as Detective Munusamy was about to make the phone call, he was ambushed by the four men, who attacked him. In a bid to defend himself, Detective Munusamy brandished his service revolver, a .38 Webley revolver, and fired three rounds at his attackers, with two shots hitting one of the assailants in the chest. Nonetheless, Detective Munusamy was overpowered by the men, who stabbed him seven times, resulting in Detective Munusamy collapsing in a pool of blood, before the attackers and the friend fled the scene on motorcycles.

Detective Munusamy was later rushed to Thomson Road Hospital for treatment, but he died twenty minutes after reaching the hospital. Coincidentally, the injured gang member was also hospitalized at the same hospital and was in critical condition by the time the police discovered him and took him into custody. The revolver of Detective Munusamy, which was stolen from him after his stabbing, was later recovered from a mailbox by a postman, Inche Mohamed Shariff bin Atan, nearby Holland Road.

== Arrests and charges ==
After the murder took place, the police investigated the case and set out on a manhunt for suspects believed to be involved in the stabbing of Detective Munusamy. Several people were held for questioning relating to the case, but ultimately, two of these suspects, 28-year-old contractor Lim Heng Soon (alias Ah Soon) and 19-year-old Quek Hock Bee, were charged with murder on 17 February 1968. Lim was the same gang member wounded by Detective Munusamy prior to his death while Quek was the person whom the fallen cop wanted to apprehend before his death.

Background details of Lim (who was born in 1941) showed that he was the eldest of three children and had a younger brother and younger sister, and he studied only five years at Fuhua Primary School before dropping out to work as a contractor, and had plans to get married with a female co-worker in mid-1968 before the murder took place.

One of the suspects, Low Ngah Ngah (alias Ah Ngah, Ngah Ngah or Low May Koon Chinese: 刘美坤; pinyin: Líu Měikūn), a factory worker and neighbour of Quek, was also identified, but he was not arrested as he could not be found. The police placed him on the wanted list. They also put up a reward of S$3,000 for his capture.

On 30 March 1968, two days after his arrest, 29-year-old Low Ngah Ngah became the third person to be charged with murder in relation to Detective Munusamy's killing. Lim, Low and Quek were all remanded for investigations and psychiatric evaluation, but after some preliminary hearings of the trio's case between April and May 1968, Quek was granted a discharge not amounting to an acquittal for the murder, leaving only Lim and Low to be the two suspects to stand trial for murder on 7 May 1968, since they were identified to be the ones attacking and stabbing Detective Munusamy to death.

== Trial and sentencing ==
=== Prosecution's case ===
Low Ngah Ngah, one of the two defendants charged with killing Detective Munusamy.

The trial of both Lim Heng Soon and Low Ngah Ngah began on 11 November 1968 at the High Court. K S Rajah and Tan Teow Yeow were assigned to prosecute both Lim and Low for murder. Khoo Hin Hiong represented Lim during his trial, while Low was represented by another lawyer, J G Advani. Supreme Court judge T Kulasekaram was the presiding judge, and a seven-man jury was set. Prior to its abolition in January 1970, jury trials were conducted to hear capital cases.

Bus conductor Neo Yew (Chinese: 梁友; pinyin: Liáng Yǒu; Pe̍h-ōe-jī: Niô͘ Iú), one of the prosecution's witnesses, testified that on the day of the murder, he was informed about Lim being shot, and he helped bring him to the hospital. He said that he remembered Lim telling him that he had been shot by a detective during a fight. A public health worker named V. Krishnan, who was a childhood friend of the deceased victim, testified that he witnessed Detective Munusamy being restrained by two men, who stabbed him with knives. Krishnan identified Lim and Low to be the ones who did the stabbing. According to forensic pathologist Dr Chandna Singh, the majority of the wounds found on the victim were fatal and they caused 24-year-old Detective Munusamy to die. Lim Keok Puan, who tended to the mortally wounded detective, corroborated this by stating that the severity of the wounds resulted in Detective Munusamy's death twenty minutes after reaching the hospital. Dr B Patel, a medical surgeon who operated on Lim also came to court to testify.

=== Defence's case ===
At the close of the prosecution's case, both defendants were called to give their defence. The first accused, Lim Heng Soon l, chose not to go to the stand. Instead, he chose to give a statement on the dock. Lim told the court that he had nothing to do with the murder. He stated that on the night of the incident, he was actually a bystander who happened to witness a fight between five men and an Indian man, who he said was Munusamy. During the fight itself, Lim claimed he saw Munusamy taking out his revolver to fire at his attackers, but the three shots strayed, and they hit Lim instead.

The second accused, Low Ngah Ngah, who also elected to give a statement on the dock, testified that he was not involved in the stabbing, but indeed got into a struggle with Munusamy, as Munusamy had assaulted and tried to arrest Quek Hock Bee, who was Low's neighbour. After the fight, Low claimed that shortly after he left the scene, he saw three men coming towards Munusamy, and he identified one of them as Sim Twa Poon (Chinese: 沈大本; pinyin: Shěn Dàběn; Pe̍h-ōe-jī: Sím Tōa-pún), an acquaintance of his, and he stated it was Sim and the other two people who stabbed Munusamy.

The prosecution submitted in rebuttal that based on the evidence, there was no reasonable doubt that the two defendants had committed murder, and asked that the jury should find the duo guilty of murder, based on the fact that the stabbing was committed intentionally and in furtherance of the common intention to attack Detective Munusamy, which led to injuries inflicted on the victim that were sufficient in the ordinary course of nature to cause death, which made both Lim and Low equally culpable for the offence of murder.

=== Final submissions and jury verdict ===
On 30 November 1968, after the prosecution and defence made their final submissions, the trial judge, Justice Kulasekaram, summed up the case on behalf of the jury and the verdict was scheduled to be given the same day after the session was adjourned.

After a three-hour adjournment, the seven-men jury returned to the courtroom after reaching their verdict. In the verdict, the jury unanimously found both 28-year-old Lim Heng Soon and 29-year-old Low Ngah Ngah guilty of murdering Detective Munusamy by common intention under both Sections 302 and 34 of the Penal Code. The jury recommended the mandatory death sentence for both Lim and Low for murder. In accordance to the jury's decision, Justice Kulasekaram found both the defendants guilty of murder and convicted them as charged, and consequently, both Lim Heng Soon and Low Ngah Ngah were sentenced to death by hanging.

== Aftermath ==
=== Appeals and executions ===
After the end of their trial, both Lim Heng Soon and Low Ngah Ngah engaged prominent lawyer and opposition politician David Saul Marshall to represent them in the appeal against their sentences and convictions. Arguing the appeal at the Court of Appeal, Marshall submitted that the trial judge, T Kulasekaram, had not properly directed the jury in terms of the summing up of the case, to allow the jury to be able to more definitely reach a guilty verdict of murder, and there were various errors made during the summing up and lack of consideration of the defence's case before the verdict. Marshall sought to set aside the convictions and sentences of Lim and Low due to the unfairness of the judgement.

On 15 November 1969, the three judges - Supreme Court judges Tan Ah Tah and F A Chua, and Chief Justice Wee Chong Jin - found that there was sufficient evidence to prove that the two defendants were guilty of the charge of murdering Detective Munusamy, and there was no error on the judge's or jury's part when summing up the case and reaching the verdict. Therefore, the three-judge panel of the appellate court rejected the appeal.

Subsequently, one of the defendants, Lim Heng Soon, petitioned for special leave to appeal to the Privy Council in London against his sentence. However, on 20 March 1970, the Privy Council refused Lim's application. Low Ngah Ngah, on the other hand, did not appeal to the Privy Council. After exhausting all avenues of appeal, the two Munusamy murderers - Lim and Low - were eventually hanged at Changi Prison sometime between 1970 and 1972. They were not among the list of death row inmates remaining alive in September 1972, when the names of the eight prisoners - including Mimi Wong and Sim Woh Kum - on death row (all for murder) were revealed to the public.

=== Lasting reputation of case ===
In the aftermath of the killers' executions, the case of Detective Munusamy's murder would be recalled several times as one of the high-profile murders of policemen while in line of their duty. Notably, in December 1985, when Detective Goh Ah Khia was shot and killed by Lim Keng Peng (alias Ah Huat), a notorious criminal, the blatant manner and brutality of Detective Goh's killing recalled Detective Munusamy's murder and several other past cases where policemen were murdered while in the line of duty during the past two decades prior to Detective Goh's killing. Lim, who was also the perpetrator behind a restaurant owner's murder, was eventually gunned down by police on 3 May 1988 after a 30-month manhunt.

== See also ==
- Capital punishment in Singapore
- List of Singapore police officers killed in the line of duty
