= Upper Bukit Timah factory murders =

1969 double murder of Hongkongers in Singapore

- Date: 15 June 1969
- Location: Upper Bukit Timah, Singapore
- Outcome: Liew and Kee convicted of murder; Liew and Kee sentenced to hang in 1970; Liew and Kee hanged at Changi Prison in 1972
- Deaths: Kan Sze Hong (42); Leung Fung (36)
- Injuries: None
- Convicted: Liew Kim Siong (20); Kee Ah Tee (19)
- Verdict: Guilty
- Convictions: Murder (two counts)
- Sentence: Death penalty

On 15 June 1969, at a factory in Singapore's Upper Bukit Timah, two Hongkongers, Kan Sze Hing (Chinese: 简细卿; Jyutping: Gaan2 Sai3 Hing1) and Leung Fung (Chinese: 梁峰; Jyutping: Loeng4 Fung1), who were workers of the factory were murdered by two men during a robbery bid. The robbers, identified as 20-year-old Liew Kim Siong (Chinese: 刘钦旋; Pe̍h-ōe-jī: Liû Khim-soân) and 19-year-old Kee Ah Tee (Chinese: 祁亚弟; Pe̍h-ōe-jī: Kî A-tî), were arrested and charged with the double murder, and investigations revealed that the two suspects and a third person had planned to rob Leung for money on the date of the stabbings. Although the two youths denied committing the double murder and put up a defence that they were not inside the factory at the time of the killings, both Liew and Kee were found guilty of murdering both Leung and Kan, and sentenced to death by the High Court in May 1970. The youths were eventually hanged in 1972 after losing their appeals against the death penalty.

== Murders ==
On 15 June 1969, two Hongkongers, who were employed at a duck feather factory in Singapore's Upper Bukit Timah, were found murdered at their workplace.

The victims were identified as Leung Fung and Kan Sze Hing, who were both 36 years old and 42 years old respectively at the time of their deaths. Kan left behind a brother Kan Shing, who worked in the same factory as her. Leung and Kan were witnessed leaving the factory while they were seriously injured and died outside the factory. The police classified the double deaths as murder and investigated the case. At the crime scene, the police recovered a bloodstained knife, which was suspected to be the murder weapon. The police also recovered a bloodstained shirt from a drain of the factory, as well as a notebook which contained writings that indicated that the murders were likely committed during a robbery bid, and this discovery wound eventually allow the police to apprehend two suspects, one of whom was the owner of the shirt, for killing the two Hongkongers.

The autopsy was conducted by forensic pathologist Dr Seah Han Cheow, and his autopsy findings were presented by Professor Chao Tzee Cheng, who later testified on behalf of Dr Seah in court (due to Dr Seah's absence and overseas trip). According to his report, Dr Seah found that there were at least ten stab wounds on the chest of Leung, and one of them penetrated Leung's heart, which was sufficient in the ordinary course of nature to cause death, while Kan herself was stabbed thrice on the chest, and she died as a result of fatal stabbing to her heart and liver. The bodies of Leung and Kan were later identified by their families at the Singapore General Hospital and recovered for funeral preparations.

== Arrests and indictment ==
On 18 June 1969, three days after the murders, a 19-year-old Singaporean youth named Kee Ah Tee, alias Tan Chooi Huat (Chinese: 陈水发; Pe̍h-ōe-jī: Tân Chúi-hoat), who was arrested two days prior, was officially charged with the double murder. Soon after his indictment, a district court ordered Kee to be remanded in police custody for one week to assist in investigations.

On 19 June 1969, it was reported that a second suspect was charged after his arrest. The second suspect, 20-year-old Liew Kim Siong, was charged on the same day with two counts of murdering Kan Sze Hing and Leung Fung four days prior.

In September 1969, a two-day preliminary hearing was conducted to hear the case at the district court, and it concluded with the case being transferred to the High Court for trial hearing on a later date. The district court reportedly stated that there was sufficient evidence against both the youths, who had earlier confessed to the crime, and thus issued the order for the case transfer to the High Court, which was authorized to conduct murder trials in Singapore.

== Trial of Liew Kim Siong and Kee Ah Tee ==
=== Cases of the prosecution and defence ===
On 14 April 1970, both Kee Ah Tee and Liew Kim Siong stood trial at the High Court for the murders of Kan Sze Hing and Leung Fung back in 1969. Freddy Yin Ee Kheng represented Kee, while John Tan Chor-Yong represented Liew, and the prosecution was led by P. R. Isaac. The trial was presided by two judges: Justice T Kulasekaram and Justice Frederick Arthur Chua (F A Chua).

One of the prosecution's key witnesses was Chan Ah Lay (Chinese: 曾亚礼; Pe̍h-ōe-jī: Chan A-lé; pinyin: Zēng Yàlǐ), who was the third accomplice of the case but turned prosecution witness against the two accused, and therefore detained under remand. Chan, also known as Ah Choon (Chinese: 亚春; Pe̍h-ōe-jī: A-Chhun; pinyin: Yà Chún), testified that he first suggested robbing one of the victims, Leung Fung, due to the man having a habit of carrying a wallet full of cash, and it was only after Kee inquired him about the robbery, Chan decided to act on the intent to rob together with Kee and Liew (who both knew each other through Chan's help). Chan further testified that he also knew Leung, with whom he had business dealings for trading duck feathers, and he also owed Leung some S$150.00. Chan also told the court that Kee and Liew entered the factory to carry out the robbery while he himself stayed outside, and he denied the defence's contention that he pushed the blame on the two accused for being responsible for murdering the two victims.

A schoolgirl named Goh Bee Wah (Chinese: 吴美华; Pe̍h-ōe-jī: Gô͘ Bí-hôa; pinyin: Wú Měihuá) also appeared as a witness during the trial, and at the time of the murders, she was living nearby the factory. Goh testified that while she was at home, she heard screams and shouts for help coming from the factory and recognized the screams as those of Kan Sze Hing, who was Goh's neighbour. Goh said that she heard three knocks coming from her window, and as she peered out, she saw a gravely injured Kan having bloodstains on her chest and hand, and Kan died while she collapsed outside Goh's house after knocking on the window, and it led to Goh contacting the police. Another witness, a labourer named S Kathamuthu, also testified that he witnessed both Kee and Liew entering the factory while he was cleaning the factory drains, and he later saw Kee throwing a bloodstained shirt onto a plank. Upon this sighting, Kathamuthu went into the factory and found Leung's body lying in a pool of blood, and this prompted him to inform Goh's father, who was his employer, and he also witnessed Kan's body lying at Goh's house as he reached the place. Both Kathamuthu and Goh had appeared in the preliminary hearing to give their evidence before the trial, which was essentially the same as their claims in court.

The prosecution's stand was that both Kee and Liew had entered the factory with an intent to commit armed robbery and had murdered both Leung Fung and Kan Sze Hing to avoid leaving behind witnesses for the robbery, and based on the youths' confessions, Liew was the one stabbing Kan to death while Kee was the one who killed Leung. However, Liew and Kee denied that they committed the murders during the trial, and argued that their confessions were made involuntarily. One of them, Liew, alleged that he was handcuffed to a chair overnight before making these statements under duress. In the end, the trial court ruled that the statements were to be admitted as evidence after finding that both accused had made the statements voluntarily.

Both men were later called to put up their defence, and Kee first took the stand. He testified that he never entered the factory on the day itself, and Kee said that Chan was the only one to enter the factory while both himself and Liew stayed outside, and he pinpointed Chan as the one responsible for murdering Kan and Leung. He also stated that the bloodstained shirt was disposed of by Chan instead of Kee himself. Kee stated that before entering the factory premises, Chan offered them two knives for Liew and Kee, who further told the court that he refused to take the knives and offered to be the lookout.

Liew was the next to give his defence, and he similarly denied taking part in the stabbings. He told the court about how he knew Chan and received the offer to commit robbery, and he denied telling his room-mate Goh Kee San that he had stabbed a woman during a robbery, alleging that the room-mate owed him money and they were not on speaking terms. When he was questioned about his confession, Liew stated he was admitting to his participation in robbery but not murder. Although evidence was adduced to show that during his pre-trial court appearance, Liew had told the magistrate Giam Chin Toon that he would plead guilty, Liew denied that he was going to plead guilty to murder, and claimed he was pleading guilty to only robbery and not murder.

=== Verdict ===
On 6 May 1970, after a trial lasting 17 days, the two trial judges – Justice F A Chua and Justice T Kulasekaram – delivered their verdict. Justice Chua, who pronounced the decision in court, stated that they rejected the defendants' claim that their confessions were made involuntarily, and he said that it was clear that both the youths entered the factory with a view to commit armed robbery and had also brought along knives with them with intent to use them if necessary. The judges also accepted that Liew was responsible for knifing Kan to death while Leung was fatally stabbed by Kee, and there was an intention on the part of both Kee and Liew to inflict bodily injuries that were sufficient in the ordinary course of nature to cause death, and hence there were sufficient grounds to return with a guilty verdict of murder.

Therefore, 21-year-old Liew Kim Siong and 20-year-old Kee Ah Tee were both found guilty of murder on both counts, and sentenced to death by hanging. Under Singaporean law, the death penalty was mandated as the sole punishment for murder upon conviction. The joint case of Liew Kim Siong and Kee Ah Tee was the first capital case where two trial judges imposed the death penalty on two men for murder, after the abolition of jury trials for capital offences in January 1970.

By January 1971, the courts of Singapore had heard 18 high-profile death penalty cases over the past year of 1970, and out of these cases, Kee and Liew were among the ten people given the death penalty, although one of these ten people would successfully had his death sentence overturned on appeal.

== Appeal processes ==
After they were both sentenced to death, Liew Kim Siong and Kee Ah Tee filed an appeal to the Court of Appeal against their murder convictions and death sentences. Both lawyers sought to prove that their defendants should not be convicted on the grounds that their statements were made involuntarily, and this was refuted by the prosecution in return. At one point, Liew's lawyer, veteran criminal lawyer Leo Fernando, fell sick and was unable to participate in the appeal, which caused the hearing to be "thrown off gear", and the appellate judges accepted Fernando's reassurance. Judgement was reserved on 14 April 1971.

On 5 June 1971, the Court of Appeal's three judges - Supreme Court judges Choor Singh and Tan Ah Tah, and Chief Justice Wee Chong Jin - dismissed the appeals of Kee and Liew, and upheld their convictions and sentences.

After the loss of their appeals, both Liew and Kee proceeded to file a motion for special leave to appeal to the Privy Council in London, which was then the final legal avenue of appeal for death row inmates in Singapore back in 1972 before its abolition in 1994. On 23 December 1971, the Privy Council dismissed the motion of the two youths, and it effectively finalized the death sentences of Liew and Kee, who were both set to hang for the double murder.

== Executions ==
After losing their final death row plea, Kee Ah Tee and Liew Kim Siong were hanged in Changi Prison on an unknown date in early 1972. As of September 1972, when the two youths were revealed to be executed earlier that same year, there were eight convicted murderers remaining on death row in Singapore – they included former bar hostess Mimi Wong and her husband Sim Woh Kum, who were both convicted of killing a Japanese woman, as well as the three kidnappers – Lee Chor Pet, Lim Kim Kwee, and Ho Kee Fatt – who were responsible for murdering a tycoon's son Ong Beang Leck.

== See also ==
- Capital punishment in Singapore
