= Tan Boon Chiang =

Singaporean prosecutor (1923–2015)

Tan Boon Chiang BBM(L) BBM PPA(P)
- Tan in 1963

President of the Industrial Arbitration Court
- In office 18 November 1965 – 4 December 1988
- Preceded by: Charles Gamba
- Succeeded by: Tan Teow Yeow

Personal details
- Born: Tan Eng Chiang; 6 April 1923 River Valley, Singapore
- Died: 28 December 2015 (aged 92)
- Spouse: Pui Yong
- Children: 2
- Education: London University; Raffles College

Chinese name
- Traditional Chinese: 陳文章
- Simplified Chinese: 陈文章
Transcriptions
Standard Mandarin
- Hanyu Pinyin: Chén Wénzhāng
- IPA: [ʈʂʰə̌n wə̌nʈʂáŋ]
Southern Min
- Hokkien POJ: Tîn Bûn-chiong

Tan Boon Chiang BBM(L) BBM PPA(P) (4 June 1923 – 28 December 2015) was a Singaporean prosecutor, who served as president of the Industrial Arbitration Court from 1965 to 1989.

Tan was chairman of the Tenants' Compensation Board, Singapore National Heart Association and the Rotary Club of Singapore. He was also deputy chairman of the University of Singapore, and vice-president of St. Andrew's Mission Hospital.

== Early life and education ==
On 6 April 1923, Tan Boon Chiang was born in River Valley, Singapore. Soon after, his family moved to Katong. His father, Tan Soo Cheng, was a descendent of Tan Kim Seng. His mother, gave birth to five sons and two sisters, and died of childbirth after giving birth to one of Tan's younger brother. All of his brothers suffered from diphtheria and typhoid fever during childhood and died.

Tan received his early education at the Anglo-Chinese Primary School (ACS) and Cairnhill Secondary School. During this period, Tan joined the Boys' Brigade at Kampong Kapor Methodist Church. He obtained a Junior Cambridge in 1940, and a Senior Cambridge in 1941.

Tan also attended Raffles College that year, but his studies were interrupted by the Japanese occupation of Singapore. Tan joined the Medical Auxiliary Service (MAS) and worked as a medic. Tan and other medics were given Singapore Traction Company buses to use as ambulances. Before the Fall of Singapore, MAS was disbanded, and Tan worked as a taxi checker in a Japanese taxi firm. Francis Seow and Lee Ek Tieng also worked in the same firm.

In 1949, Tan obtained a diploma in arts, and he became a teacher at ACS. Tan was scoutmaster of the school's scout group.

Tan attended the University of London and studied law. On 23 November 1954, Tan was called to the bar at Lincoln's Inn.

== Career ==
From 1955 to 1956, Tan was the assistant commissioner of the Ministry of Labour.

Tan was appointed as a crown counsel and a deputy public prosecutor in September 1956. In September 1959, after receiving a pay cut, Tan resigned from his positions and joined Laycock and Ong, a law firm started by John Laycock.

Tan was elected president of the Anglo-Chinese School Old Boys' Association on 4 March 1961. Tan rejoined the judicial service on 15 May, and he was appointed as a deputy public prosecutor. Tan was appointed as the deputy president of the Industrial Arbitration Court (IAC) on 22 October 1962.

On 9 March 1962, seven members of the Singapore Motor Workshop Employees' Union attacked three non-union colleagues, while on strike against the Singapore branch of the Ford Motor Company. The seven members were fined $150 each in August. In March 1963, the branch's managing director, Gordon William Withell, asked IAC whether Ford had the right to dismiss the perpetrators, after the union claimed they had "no right to take any disciplinary action" based on clause 4 of an agreement between the union and the company, Withell said that the perpetrators were capable of planning future organised violent attacks, and the company felt that this was prima facie case for dismissal. As the presiding officer, Tan ruled that Ford had the right to dismiss. He elaborated:

The court is of the view that having held that the company has the inherent right to dismiss, it must also have the inherent right to ask any of its employees to show cause on why they should not be dismissed. A right to dismiss must, in other words, include a preparatory right to inform any of its employees that the company intends to dismiss them.

Such action as had been taken by it in no way prejudices the case of the seven employees as the important question of the actual dismissal has yet to be thrashed out, depending upon whether or not the employees choose to lodge a grievance to the negotiating committee.

The decision of the court must therefore be that the company has rightly acted within the provisions of clause 4(A) of the agreement, and the court must order that the provisions of clause 4 be strictly adhered to, step by step, in logical sequence, and the matter of the dismissal of the seven employees be referred eventually to an ad hoc negotiating committee, since the union has already in this case lodged a protest against the intention of the company to dismiss the employees concerned.

In 1963, Tan was elected president of the Singapore Boy Scouts. Tan became acting president of IAC on 15 September 1964, succeeding Charles Gamba. On 10 June 1965, Tan's previous role was assumed by S. Natarajan, an accountant. In the 1967 annual report, Tan wrote that unions and organisations should improve advocacy in court. He said:

I am of course, aware of the fact that laymen from both sides are presenting cases in court, which in other circumstances would have been undertaken by legal practitioners.

Be that as it may, it is important for industrial parties to ensure that their points of view are put across to the best of their advantage, and that no case should be lost for want of adequate presentation.

Competent handling of cases can help create a more efficient machinery. There have been less disputes referred to the court for settlement than in previous years. This is a desirable state of affairs.

Tan conducted lectures about arbitration at the University of Singapore in July 1969. Tan became the founding chairman of Singapore National Heart Association in February 1970. He said that the association's aim was to increase awareness of cardiovascular diseases and treatment methods. In March 1971, to encourage more research, Tan announced that the association is offering a yearlong fellowship in cardiology to medical officers.

During a wage dispute between Union Pte Ltd (Note: The local bottling company of PepsiCo, producing drinks such as Pepsi, Mirinda, and Schweppes.) and its union on 24 June 1971, Tan rejected claims for higher wages, but awarded four cases of soft drinks per year to each worker for either Chinese New Year, Hari Raya, Deepavali, or Christmas.

On 27 June 1972, Tan was appointed chairman of the Rotary Club of Singapore, succeeding Tan Tock Peng. Tan was succeeded by Fred Barretto in June 1973.

Tan was appointed by the government in February 1973 to chair a public inquiry committee into juvenile crime, named the Committee on Crime and Delinquency. Assisting him as deputy chairman was Tay Seow Huah. In September 1974, the committee submitted its report to the government. Some recommendations included implementing prosecution of irresponsible parents of the juvenile delinquents, and access to vocational training leading to employment. As such, on 18 March 1975, proposed amendments to the Employment Act were announced by Minister for Labour Ong Pang Boon.

In March 1977, Tan urged the National Wages Council to issue guidelines on integrating wage increases into salary to avoid misinterpretation, and warned that IAC may otherwise face more wage disputes. Tan was appointed by the Ministry of Finance on 6 August 1987 as chairman of the Valuation Review Board, for a period of three years.

On 4 December 1988, Tan retired as president of IAC, and he was succeeded by Tan Teow Yeow.

== Personal life ==
Tan was a Christian, and was a longtime member of Wesley Methodist Church. He was married to Pui Yong, a physiology lecturer at the University of Singapore, whom he had two children with. Tan died at age 92 on 28 December 2015.

== Awards and decorations ==
- Public Service Star (Bar), in 1999.
- Public Service Star, in 1981.
- Public Administration Medal (Silver), in 1963.
- Defence Medal
