= Tsao Yu Hang =

Tsao as the principal of Nan Hwa Girls' High School.

Tsao Yu Hang (Chinese: 曹玉航; 1919 – 11 March 2015) was a prominent educator in Singapore. She assumed the post of headmaster at the Chinese-medium Nan Hwa Girls' High School in 1972, at a time when Chinese schools in the country were declining in popularity. She oversaw its relocation to Clementi and its shift from a girls'-only to a co-educational school, after which it became the Nan Hua High School.

== Early life and education ==
Tsao was born in the county of Panyu in Guangdong, China in 1919. Her family, once booksellers, originated in the Hebei region, eventually crossing the Yellow River several centuries before her birth and settling in Panyu. Her father worked at the Ministry of Finance and her mother taught at the South China Normal University. She and her parents first relocated to Tianjin before moving to Shanghai when she was eight. She studied in the Department of Political Science and learnt to speak French at the St. John's University in Shanghai, graduating into the Second Sino-Japanese War in June 1941. In this period, she taught literature and history in a girls' middle school and worked as an administrator with a German hospital.

After the war, Tsao went to work for the Shanghai Municipal People's Government. In this capacity, she was selected as the secretary to a military delegation sent to Berlin and the Paris Peace Conference. She fled China with her husband following the 1949 Proclamation of the People's Republic of China. They did not wish to follow the Kuomintang to Taiwan and looked elsewhere, eventually settling in Singapore.

== Career ==
In Singapore, Tsao chose to become an educator, first teaching at the Chinese-medium Nanyang Girls' High School, which was located in the vicinity her then-residence. In January 1970, she began teaching at the Nan Hwa Girls' High School, also a Chinese-medium secondary school. In 1971, Yang Shui Chor, who had served as the headmaster of the Nan Hwa Girls' High School from its reopening in September 1945, officially retired. At the end of December, the school's board of governors announced that Tsao was had been elected Yang's successor, assuming the post at the start of the following year.

Tsao was appointed headmaster at a time when Chinese-medium schools in the country as a whole were suffering from a severe decline in enrollment. Additionally, much of the neighbourhood surrounding the school's premises on Adis Road had been marked for redevelopment; this led to a decline in the number of residents in the area. As such, Tsao saw it necessary to relocate the school elsewhere. She selected a site in the newly developed town of Clementi, which was then without any "prestigious schools' that Nan Hwa would have to deal with. Despite having reached the retirement age in the early 1980s, she continued as principal to oversee the school's relocation, completed in 1982. The school also began taking in male students, thus shifting to co-educational; it was then renamed the Nan Hua High School. This led to the student population increasing from several hundred to over a thousand.

With the school in a more "stable" position, Tsao announced in November 1983 that she would be stepping down at the end of the year, just as the shift to being co-educational was to be completed. She was succeeded as headmaster by the vice principal, Yap Siew Keng. Tsao continued with the school as an advisor to the board of governors.

== Personal life and death ==
In 1949, she married Yu Jieyuan, a journalist with the Central News Agency. After the couple emigrated to Singapore, Yu began working for an English-language newspaper. On her retirement, the couple left Singapore and settled in Vancouver, Canada, becoming neighbours with their daughter. There, Tsao became active with various local alumni associations for Chinese universities such as that of the St. John's University and the Tsinghua University, which was Yu's alma mater. In her later years, she continued to donate to the scholarships and bursaries of the Nanyang University, even as her advanced age began to impede her from visiting Singapore.

Tsao died in Vancouver on 13 March 2015.
