= Murder of Chia Chun Fong =

1980 murder of a babysitter in Singapore

Chia Chun Fong
- A 1978 wedding photo of Chia Chun Fong, the babysitter who was murdered in 1980
- Born: 1957; Muar, Johor, Malaysia
- Died: 23 September 1980 (aged 23); Opera Estate, Singapore
- Cause of death: Fatal stab wound to vertebral artery
- Other names: Ong Chun Fong; Jenny; Jennie
- Occupation: Babysitter
- Known for: Murder victim
- Spouse: Ong Ka Teck (m. 1978; her death. 1980)

On 23 September 1980, inside a terrace house in Opera Estate, Singapore, 23-year-old babysitter Chia Chun Fong (谢芹芳 Xiè Qínfāng) was found dead with a knife stuck to her mouth. The cause of death, which was previously unknown in Singapore's medical history, was due to the knife cutting through a vertebral artery while being pushed into the mouth, and it consequently led to Chia dying from excessive blood loss. Chia, who was entrusted to care for the infant son of her neighbour, was later found to have been murdered by her husband's distant relative Tan Cheow Bock (陈昭木 Chén Zhāomù), who fled from Singapore after the killing. Tan remained on the run for seven years before he was caught for vehicle theft in Malaysia, and extradited back to Singapore for trial. Close to ten years after the murder of Chia, Tan was found guilty of murdering Chia and sentenced to death by the High Court on 31 August 1990.

== Murder investigation ==
On the Tuesday morning of 23 September 1980, at a terrace house in Maria Avenue, located at Opera Estate in Singapore, a babysitter was found dead by her mother-in-law in her bedroom, after the elderly woman came back from shopping for materials to celebrate Mid-Autumn Festival.

The victim was 23-year-old Chia Chun Fong, alias Jenny or Ong Chun Feng. At the time of her death, Chia was found with a fruit knife protruding from her mouth, and Gareth Berlee, the 3 1/2-month-old grandson of Chia's 57-year-old neighbour Iris Gomez, was found unharmed inside her bedroom. According to Gomez, she last saw Chia alive at 8.30am, after she went to the house to let Chia take care of her grandson, and it was about half an hour before Chia herself was discovered dead. Neighbours called the police, who all searched the house and found that an assortment of jewelry was missing from the premises. Chia was married for two years with no children at the time she died. The police confirmed eventually that five necklaces, five rings, four hand bracelets and three hand bangles were stolen.

The police classified the case as murder, and both Deputy Superintendent of Police (DSP) Gan Boon Leong and Deputy Inspector Cheok Koon Seng were placed in charge of the investigations. It was determined that the motive was robbery, since several valuables were missing from the house itself. The police also recovered a broken washboard from the bedroom, which was possibly used by the murderer(s) to assault Chia since her body also had multiple bruises, suggesting that a violent struggle took place. The police were also looking at the possibility that the robbery was just a plot to throw them off. They also dusted for fingerprints in the crime scene, and believed that the murder was committed by someone known to the victim.

Less than a week after the murder of Chia Chun Fong, the Singapore Police Force issued a notice of arrest for a 28-year-old labourer Tan Cheow Bock, whom they classified as a prime suspect behind the murder. However, Tan was not arrested and the case remained unsolved for seven years. The murder of Chia Chun Fong was considered as one of the most brutal killings to happen in the year 1980, where a total of 66 murder cases was reported to the police.

== Arrest of suspect ==
In March 1987, seven years after the murder of Chia Chun Fong, the wanted suspect, Tan Cheow Bock, was arrested by the Royal Malaysia Police in Johor for stealing cars, and he was charged on 23 May 1987 for the crime. During investigations, the Malaysian police discovered that Tan was wanted by the Singaporean authorities for the 1980 murder of Chia Chun Fong, and the Singaporean police were notified of his presence in Malaysia. Shortly after Tan was charged in a Malaysian court with vehicle theft, the Singapore Police Force successfully secured an extradition offer to have Tan sent back to Singapore to stand trial for murdering Chia back in 1980.

On 25 May 1987, Tan was officially charged in the State Courts with murder, which carried a death sentence if found guilty under the Singaporean Penal Code. During that same month, the Singapore Police Force issued a media statement and thanked the Malaysian authorities for helping to track down and arrest Tan, who was one of the twelve suspects extradited to Singapore with the Malaysian police's assistance between January and June 1987; among the list of suspects extradited also included Hensley Anthony Neville, a Singaporean wanted for the 1984 rape and murder of interior designer Lim Hwee Huang. Neville was sentenced to death in November 1990, and hanged on 28 August 1992 for the gruesome crime.

== Trial of Tan Cheow Bock ==
=== Prosecution's case ===
Tan Cheow Bock, who was put on trial ten years after he murdered Chia Chun Fong.

On 20 August 1990, nearly ten years after the murder of Chia Chun Fong, 38-year-old Tan Cheow Bock stood trial for one count of murder at the High Court. The prosecution was led by Lee Seiu Kin while the defence counsel of Tan was led by Edmond Pereira. The trial was presided over by both Judicial Commissioner M Karthigesu and Justice Lai Kew Chai.

One of the prosecution's first witnesses was Professor Chao Tzee Cheng, a renowned senior forensic pathologist. Professor Chao, who performed an autopsy on Chia's corpse, testified that when the knife was plunged into Chia's mouth, it lodged into the bone at the back of the skull so deep that it cut through the vertebral artery, and this particular injury was sufficient in the ordinary course of nature to cause death, since Chia lost a massive amount of blood from the wound. Additionally, under cross-examination from Pereira, Professor Chao told the court that from a medical perspective, although the injury itself was fatal, he commented that the injury was extremely unusual and he had never came across such an injury in his past cases as a forensic pathologist, and he said it was an off-chance that the blade could have penetrated the bone via a gap and thus cut the artery. He also found two more knife wounds on Chia's private parts, which were also caused by stabbing but were not fatal in nature.

Chia's mother-in-law, 55-year-old housewife Cheong Lye Hwa (or Chua Lye Hue), was also among the first witnesses to testify in court. Cheong said that she was shocked when she found her daughter-in-law lying in a pool of blood and had a knife protruding from her mouth, she initially mistook that Chia committed suicide, and after failing to pull out the knife for two to three times, she called a neighbour for help. 35-year-old immigration officer Ong Ka Teck, Chia's husband, revealed that Tan was his distant relative, as well as a long-time family friend who used to be their neighbour at Kampong Chai Chee before their relocation, and he also found that several pieces of jewelry were missing from his house. 38-year-old Sim Ken Tiang, a friend of Tan, testified in court that on the date of the murder, Tan had told him he lost his bets in horse races, and Sim also noticed Tan having fresh scratch marks on his neck but did not inquire further. It was also adduced by the prosecution during the trial that Tan had incurred a debt of S$1,962 from gambling two days before the crime, although a female debtor who helped Tan placed the bets had never for once demanded Tan to return the money.

It was the prosecution's case that Tan had robbed and murdered Chia in light of his financial troubles. In his statements to Sergeant Jaswinder Singh, who interviewed him after his extradition to Singapore, Tan said that he went to Chia's house with hopes to borrow some money to pay off his debt. Chia, who was then alone caring for her neighbour's baby at home, told Tan that she did not have money, and Tan therefore formulated the intention to rob her, and he verbally expressed it to Chia. This caused a struggle between both Chia and Tan, which led to the fatal stabbing of Chia. Tan said that when he stabbed Chia on the mouth, he only did so to silence her and not kill her, since she was shouting for help. After the stabbing, Tan stole some valuables from the house and fled. Tan told police that he only heard of Chia's death a day after the robbery, and upon hearing the news, he felt sorry for causing Chia's death, which was why he went to the funeral to help Chia's family to load and unload the coffin. After doing so, Tan decided to go to a fishing port in Jurong, and with the help of an Indonesian fisherman, he fled to Indonesia, where he hid for two years before he travelled to Malaysia to continue hiding from the authorities, and he spent five years working odd jobs in Johor, Malaysia while on the run, consisting of four years in Kota Tinggi and one year in Johor Bahru, where he was eventually caught in March 1987 for stealing cars.

=== Tan's testimony ===
Tan elected to go on the stand when his defence was called. Tan, who was married with two children at the time of the murder, recounted that as a result of the debts he incurred from gambling and betting on horse races, he went to Chia's house to borrow money from her. However, per Tan's testimony, Chia used some abusive language on him after he asked for a loan, and she persisted even after Tan pleaded with her to stop the verbal abuse. This eventually infuriated Tan and therefore, there were blows exchanged between the both of them, and while Chia used a washing board to whack at him, Tan grabbed the nearest object he could reach to protect himself, and it happened to be a knife. Tan later went after Chia, who ran upstairs, and he wanted to confront her on why she verbally abused him rather than wanting to hurt her. Another fight between Chia and Tan ensued after they came face to face, and while Chia managed to overpower Tan and grabbed ahold his neck to strangle him, Tan used the knife to stab in between her thighs twice, although he was unaware that he had struck her on her private parts. During the scuffle, Tan thrust the knife upwards and Chia finally fell backwards, and Tan immediately realized that he had stabbed her on the mouth. This caused Tan to panic and he left the house frantically, but not before he stole some jewelry he spotted in the house. Tan denied on the stand that he intended to rob Chia, stating it was just a verbal threat to stop Chia from verbally abusing him, and he never meant to hurt Chia throughout.

Still, there were certain discrepancies in Tan's testimony compared to the other witnesses. Professor Chao was called to the stand again to give his evidence, and he testified that if Tan inflicted the wounds on the private parts of Chia while he himself lying down (in addition to Chia strangling him), the wounds would have been located at a higher position, and it was more likely that Tan inflicted the wounds on the private parts while Chia was lying on her back. Also, the wound to the mouth was inflicted from left to right, and if Tan had inflicted the injury backhand, it should be from right to left. Chia's mother-in-law said that they would not keep the jewelry out on the open inside the house, and Chia's husband said that during their four years of relationship (including two years of marriage), Chia had never for once used abusive language on people around her.

=== Closing submissions ===
In their closing submissions, the prosecution submitted that even if it was true that Tan and Chia got involved in a dispute before her death, it cannot be discounted that Tan had the intention to commit robbery since he admitted in his confession that he stole some valuables from Chia's house. Deputy Public Prosecutor Lee Seiu Kin argued that there was an irresistible inference that Tan had the intention to cause serious injuries on the victim, since he used a large amount of force to plunge the knife into Chia's mouth, and in turn, the injury intentionally inflicted on Chia was sufficient in the ordinary course of nature to cause death, and therefore Tan's actions constituted an act of murder by intentionally inflicting a fatal injury(s) as defined under Section 300(c) of the Penal Code.

The defence, on the other hand, argued that Tan never had the intention to cause death to start with, and he never in turn had the intent to cause any fatal bodily harm on Chia. Defence lawyer Edmond Pereira also submitted that Tan's murder charge should be reduced to manslaughter, which carries the maximum sentence of life imprisonment, and he pointed out that Tan only wanted to keep Chia quiet by stabbing her in the mouth, and if Tan had the intent to commit murder from the beginning, he would have easily targeted the more vital parts of Chia's body instead of the mouth, where death rarely occurred due to stabbing in the mouth.

=== Verdict ===
On 31 August 1990, after a trial lasting ten days, both Justice Lai Kew Chai and Judicial Commissioner M Karthigesu delivered their verdict. Justice Lai, who pronounced the judgement in court, stated that there was no doubt that Tan had intentionally caused the fatal injury on Chia, and accepted the prosecution's arguments. They further found that Tan came to Chia's house with robbery in his mind, and during his altercation with Chia, Tan had stabbed Chia and caused her death, although he did not intend to inflict the particular injury so as to cause her death. The judges also took to conclude that despite this fact, it did not detract from Tan's intention to cause serious injuries on Chia and in turn of this intention, the injury deliberately caused had led to Chia's death, which were sufficient grounds to return with a guilty verdict of murder. Aside from this, the judges also rejected Tan's defence that he accidentally stabbed Chia during a fight and that he did so under grave and sudden provocation by Chia's alleged verbal abuse.

Therefore, 38-year-old Tan Cheow Bock was found guilty of murder, and sentenced to death by hanging. Under Singaporean law, the mandatory death penalty was warranted for offenders convicted of murder under Section 302 of the Penal Code.

== Aftermath ==
On 9 September 1991, Tan Cheow Bock's appeal was dismissed by the Court of Appeal. In their judgement, the three judges - Justice L P Thean (Thean Lip Ping), Justice Frederick Arthur Chua (F A Chua) and Chief Justice Yong Pung How - stated that they disagreed with the defence that Tan accidentally stabbed Chia during a fight, and they also further affirmed the trial court's decision to convict Tan of murder. Based on the precedent case of Visuvanathan Thillai Kannu, who was found guilty of murdering a man and hanged in 1979, the Court of Appeal also laid out the guiding principles for a person to be convicted of murder by intentionally causing a fatal injury(s) under Section 300(c) of the Penal Code, which were the requirements met in convicting Tan of murder:

1. that the accused did an act which caused the death of the deceased;
2. that the said act was done with the intention of causing bodily injury;
3. that the injury caused —
- (a) was intended and was not accidental or otherwise unintentional; and
- (b) was sufficient in the ordinary course of nature to cause death.

Since the loss of his appeal, Tan Cheow Bock was eventually hanged on an unknown date at Changi Prison.

In the aftermath of his trial and execution, Tan's case was constantly cited as a case of legal study with regards to the offence of murder under Section 300(c) of the Penal Code, which scrutinized the guiding principles to find whether a person had the intention to inflict a bodily injury that was sufficient in the ordinary course of nature to cause death, which would determine if a person was, in the end, guilty of murder even if an injury inflicted was rarely observed but could cause death.

== See also ==
- Capital punishment in Singapore
