= Murder of Tan Hui Ngin =

1990 rape-murder of a woman at Punggol, Singapore

Tan Hui Ngin
- Tan Hui Ngin, pictured before her death
- Born: Tan Hui Ngin; 1960; Singapore
- Died: 12 October 1990 (aged 30); Punggol, Singapore
- Cause of death: Murdered
- Resting place: An unnamed cemetery in Singapore
- Other name: Ah Ngin
- Occupations: Fisherwoman; Babysitter
- Employer: Her father
- Known for: Murder victim
- Parent: Lim Lai Seang (mother)

On 16 October 1990, four days after her disappearance, 30-year-old Tan Hui Ngin (陈惠银 Chén Huìyín) was found dead at a disused egg hatchery nearby her home at Punggol, and when her decomposed body was discovered, Tan was half-naked and had fractures to her skull, and showed signs of possible sexual assault before her death. Five months later, with the assistance from the Malaysian police, a suspect was finally arrested and brought back to Singapore to be charged with the brutal rape-murder of Tan. The killer, Tan's 30-year-old childhood friend Lim Lye Hock (林来福 Lín Laífú), was eventually found guilty of murdering Tan and sentenced to death on 1 December 1993.

== Discovery ==
On 16 October 1990, two contractors were inspecting an abandoned chicken hatchery at Punggol due to an upcoming redevelopment project. Just as they scouted the area, they discovered a half-naked decomposing female corpse inside the abandoned building; the woman laid in a pool of blood with a chair covering her head. There were a total of eleven injuries found on the victim, including skull fractures.

The police were contacted upon the men's gruesome discovery, and as they conducted their first stage investigations, the investigators did not rule out the possibility of sexual assault while they classified the death of the woman as murder. Dr Clarence Tan, the forensic pathologist, certified that the skull fractures found on the victim's head were the main cause of her death, and were likely caused by a blunt object. With the help of the woman's fingerprints, the police identified the woman as 30-year-old Tan Hui Ngin, a Singaporean who was originally reported missing three to four days before the discovery of her remains. It was speculated that Tan might have known her killer(s), since she was known to only hang out with acquaintances, and a man was also last seen driving nearby the area Tan was murdered. Tan was last seen alive at about 1.10pm when she left her house to go to her eldest brother-in-law's house to babysit his three children, and she never returned home at 7pm as she usually did, and she was speculated to have been killed between 6.30pm and 8pm on 12 October 1990.

Tan was the fifth of seven children in her family, and she had three elders sisters (one of whom died young), one elder brother and two younger brothers in her family, who all made a living as fishermen. They also lived about 300m away from where Tan was murdered. According to her elder brother and father, Tan was an obedient woman who would often sail out to sea with her father to catch fish, and additionally, after the death of her eldest sister, Tan began to take care of her sister's three children everyday after she finished fishing. Tan's youngest brother also stated that at the time of Tan's death, the Tan family were supposed to finalize their plans to move to a HDB flat at Hougang within a few days in view of the upcoming redevelopment of their kampong. Reportedly, Tan's parents were devastated at the death of their daughter and hoped that the killer can be caught, and Tan's father also went to pray at the temple in hopes that the case could be solved soon.

== Arrest and murder charge ==
=== Lim's arrest in Malaysia ===
On 22 March 1991, about five months after the brutal murder of Tan Hui Ngin, a 30-year-old Singaporean was arrested at a farm in Batu Pahat, Johor by the Royal Malaysia Police in connection to Tan's killing, and he was handed over to the Singaporean police at the Woodlands Checkpoint. The Singapore Police Force sent a public message to show their gratitude to the Malaysian police for helping to nab the suspect.

The man, who worked as a carpenter, was also revealed to be a childhood friend of Tan, and he had apparently confessed to killing Tan due to an alleged monetary dispute between him and the murder victim. The suspect, whose name was Lim Lye Hock, was charged with murder on 23 March 1991.

=== Background of Lim ===
Lim Lye Hock, born in 1960, grew up in the same kampong as Tan Hui Ngin and they became friends from a young age. Lim gradually fell in love with Tan and they slowly formed an intimate relationship, before they broke up in 1983 and Lim later met another woman, and married her in March 1989. Still, Lim continued to meet Tan and they constantly had sex with one another. Eventually, Lim moved out of the kampong and went to live in Yishun, but he maintained contact with Tan and continued to have sex with her.

According to his wife Tee Guat Kiyau (张月娇 Zhāng Yuèjiāo) and stepbrother Chng Soon Huat, Lim was often violent and would pick either quarrels or fights with people. Lim had once used a chair to brutally hit his younger sister and it caused her to suffer a permanent spinal injury, and he often abused his wife severely. One of these instances included Lim pulling his wife's hair very hard as he was enraged at her telling him to buy chicken rice when the stall turned out to be closed, and another was about him hurling an iron pipe at his wife for nagging at him to go have dinner when he was busy repairing a friend's motorcycle.

== Trial of Lim Lye Hock ==
=== Prosecution's case ===
Lim Lye Hock, who was charged with murdering Tan Hui Ngin after he allegedly raped her.

On 24 March 1993, 33-year-old Lim Lye Hock stood trial at the High Court for the murder of Tan Hui Ngin. He was represented by Thomas Tham and Mansur Hussain, while the trial prosecutor was P. Arul Selvamalar. Justice Lai Kew Chai was appointed as the presiding judge of the case.

Dr Clarence Tan, the forensic pathologist in charge of the autopsy, was the first prosecution witness to take the stand. Dr Tan testified that the severe skull fractures on Tan Hui Ngin's head were the main cause of her death, and he considered that the brick found nearby the scene was the most likely murder weapon used by Lim to bludgeon the victim's head with. He also stated that based on the exposure of Tan's breasts through the pulling of her shirt and bra, and the position and posture Tan was laid while in death, it was possible that some form of sexual assault had happened on her, although the high state of decomposition hindered the accuracy of the tests for any sign of sperms or semen at her vagina. Dr Tan also clarified in court that Lim did not engage in necrophilia, a form of sexual intercourse with or attraction towards corpses. The prosecution therefore argued that Lim had in fact raped Tan before intentionally killing her by bludgeoning her on the head fatally.

Tee Guat Kiyau, Lim's wife who was a Malaysian, was another crucial witness for the prosecution, as she heard her husband confessing to her about killing Tan. However, the defence counsel argued that it was wrong for the prosecution to call upon Tee as a witness for their case, as under the Evidence Act, any communication between the husband and wife should be considered as marital communication and thus privileged, and cannot be validated as evidence, even if such could incriminate the suspect in an offence. However, Justice Lai overruled the defence's arguments and ruled in favour of the prosecution, ruling that as decreed by another section of the Evidence Act, a witness had every right to be summoned to court to testify against his or her spouse during a criminal proceeding.

In testifying against her husband, Tee stated that on the day of the murder, Lim returned home after killing Tan and he told his wife he wanted to flee to Malaysia, since he was allegedly chased by illegal moneylenders over his debts. Tee, however, noticed something was amiss from the bloodstains found on Lim's feet, and she also similarly became suspicious over Lim's behaviour after they both went to Johor to seek refuge at Tee's family's home and later at other places before reaching Batu Pahat. After Tee confrontly probed her husband about what happened, Tee stated Lim admitted to killing Tan and described how he killed her by using a stick and brick to bludgeon her to death. On the stand, Tee additionally stated her husband was "more than a beast" and he should pay for his crime, and that she was compelled to tell the truth after embracing her newly-found Christian beliefs.

The defence counsel argued that Tee, who initially did not tell police how her husband killed Tan or confessed, was not a consistent witness and had made up the entire story of Lim's supposed confession out of spite and hatred towards her husband for his abuse and to ensure he be sentenced to hang for murdering Tan, and they pointed out that there was the DNA of a third person being found at the crime scene, which raised the possibility of another person being responsible for killing Tan, and that the prosecution was wrong to reject Lim's claims of a killing due to monetary issues and proceeded with arguing that he had a motive to rape and kill Tan. In response, the prosecution rebutted that Lim had earlier confessed to using the brick, which was stained with Tan's blood, to hurl at Tan's face and caused hurt, and that there was no dispute that Tee had told both the police and court that her husband confessed to her that he murdered Tan using the brick, and this information was also made known to Tee's father and brother through Tee's own words. Subsequently, the trial judge ruled that Lim had a case to answer.

=== Lim's defence ===
When Lim was called to give his defence, he elected to go on the stand and he stated that he met Tan at the chicken hut on the day of the killing, as he wanted Tan to return him a sum of S$4,600, which he lent to Tan. He stated that he repeatedly pressed for Tan to return him the money, especially since he needed it to afford his wedding expenses, but Tan's refusal to return the money led to him having to postpone the wedding, and he claimed it brought him great humiliation.

Lim continued to deny that he raped Tan or intentionally killed Tan. He said that during the meeting, not only did Tan refused to return the money, she even exposed herself half-naked and blackmailed him that she would report him to the police. Lim said that after Tan threatened her, his only thoughts were to strip her naked to let her walk home without her clothes and humiliate her, but she threw the brick at him, resulting in Lim picking up the brick to throw at her face, thus causing her to bleed on the head. Lim claimed a struggle ensued between himself and Tan, and he used the stick to hit her during the fight, before she finally collapsed and he used a chair to cover her face. Lim said that Tan was still alive but unconscious when he left her there. When asked about his violent outbursts, Lim said he only did so if the people he argued with had not talked back at him, and these would have been enough for him to display his anger and violence.

Dr Wong Yip Cheong, the defence psychiatrist, was called to testify for Lim to support his defence of diminished responsibility. Dr Wong claimed that Lim suffered from intermittent explosive disorder, which contributed to his frequent acts of violence and emotional outbursts, and that the disorder was sufficient to impair his ability to control his temper and his mental faculties at the time he committed the murder. However, the prosecution's psychiatrist, Dr Ang Ah Ling, revealed that Lim was perfectly normal and although he may be violent, he was fully in control of himself and could decide his actions or stop himself even when he was armed with weapons and about to assault anyone in an outburst.

== Death penalty ==
On 1 December 1993, after a trial lasting three weeks, 33-year-old Lim Lye Hock was found guilty of murder and sentenced to death.

In convicting Lim of murder, Justice Lai Kew Chai found that the prosecution had proven beyond a reasonable doubt that Lim had violently attacked and intentionally killed Tan Hui Ngin, and had also referred to the evidence of Lim stealing her handbag and personal valuables to avoid identification of the victim. He was also persuaded by Dr Ang Ah Ling's psychiatric report that Lim's mental responsibility was not affected by intermittent explosive disorder at the time he killed Tan, and he was capable of realizing the full magnitude of his actions and self-control. Therefore, Justice Lai was satisfied that Lim should be liable to a conviction for murder, and therefore imposed the mandatory death penalty on Lim. According to news reports, Lim's younger sister was devastated at the verdict and she nearly charged outside of the courtroom before Lim's mother calmed her down, while a female member of the audience gave a thumbs up at the judgement. Lim himself smiled a little as he was led away from court by the police officers.

Two years later in 1995, Lim lost his appeal against the murder charge and death sentence, and he was eventually hanged. In upholding Lim's conviction and sentence, one of the three judges of Appeal L P Thean held that based on the marital communication privilege principle, Lim's wife had every right to come to court to give her testimony against her husband in court based on what she witnessed and what her husband told her, although she should not reveal the communication between her and her husband unless she got the consent from Lim to do so. Overall, the Court of Appeal found no error in Lim's conviction and hence dismissed his appeal. This appeal judgement became a legal case study where it examines the legality of using the testimony of a defendant's spouse against the defendant in a criminal trial, whether it incriminates the accused.

In the aftermath of Lim's case and execution, the main investigation officer Lau Hock Peng was awarded in 1997 for his efforts in arresting the killer of the Tan Hui Ngin case and his dedication and service to the police force.

== See also ==
- Capital punishment in Singapore
- List of solved missing person cases: 1950–1999
