= Nan Hua High School =

- 南华中学; Sekolah Tinggi Nan Hua

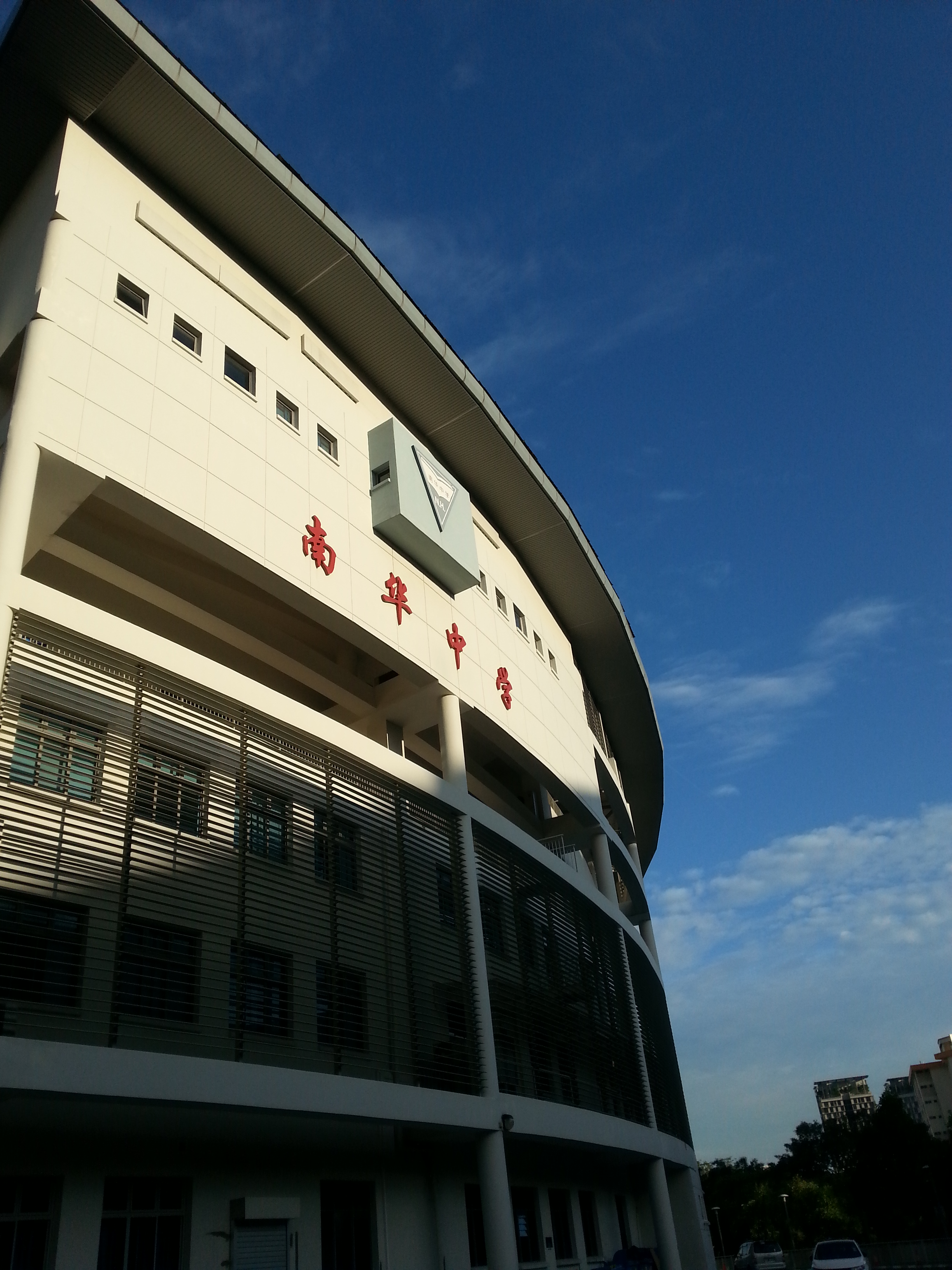

Location
- 41 Clementi Avenue 1, Singapore 129956; 1.308381°N 103.769167°E

Information
- Type: Government; Co-educational; Special Assistance Plan (SAP); Autonomous
- Motto: 忠孝仁爱、礼义廉耻 (Loyalty, Filial Piety, Humanity, Love, Courtesy, Righteousness, Integrity, Sense of Shame)
- Established: 14 June 1917; 109 years ago
- Founder: Xiong Shangfu
- Session: Single-Session
- School code: 3047
- Chairman: William Leong Sin Yuen
- Principal: Chiew Jing Wen
- Enrollment: approx. 1250
- Colour: Red Blue White
- Website: nanhuahigh.moe.edu.sg/

Nan Hua High School (NHHS) (simplified Chinese: 南华中学; traditional Chinese: 南華中學; pinyin: Nánhuá Zhōngxué) is a co-educational autonomous government secondary school in Clementi, Singapore.

The school offers the four-year Express course leading to the Singapore-Cambridge GCE Ordinary Level national examination.

Founded in 1917, Nan Hua High School is the tenth Special Assistance Plan (SAP) school in Singapore, and is an autonomous school since 2001. The school is also the West Zone Centre of Excellence for Chinese Language and Culture. Nan Hua High School is not affiliated with Nan Hua Primary School, with which it has a shared heritage.

== History ==
=== Nan Hua Girls' School (1917–1955) ===
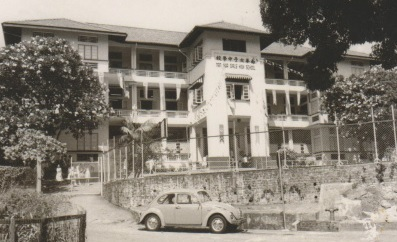
Nan Hwa Girls' School (Main) at Adis Road

Nan Hua High School was founded on 14 June 1917 as Nam Wah Girls' School (simplified Chinese: 南华女学校; traditional Chinese: 南華女學校), by Xiong Shangfu, an overseas Chinese industrialist and prominent figure in the local Cantonese community. The school was established with the aim to give girls in Singapore the opportunity of receiving an education which was a privilege few girls had at that time. It was first founded in a makeshift school with two rented shop-houses converted into four classrooms in Coleman Street. From a cohort of fewer than 100 Chinese girls, the student population grew rapidly and in 1921, the school moved to a new building in Bencoolen Street to accommodate its expansion. However, in 1924, the school was forced to close temporarily due to financial difficulties. After a series of public appeals, contributions of funds from the community helped pay off the school's debts, and the school re-opened.

By 1928, the Basic Teacher Training Programme had started and the student population continued to grow, leading to space constraints. In 1931, a new school building at Adis Road was ready and it became the "Main School" that ran normal training classes for teachers alongside primary classes. The old building at Bencoolen Street continued to function as a branch school offering primary classes. In 1941, Nan Hwa Girls' School was forced to cease operations as a Japanese invasion drew near. The school complex at Adis Road was turned into the headquarters for the Imperial Japanese Army shortly after the surrender of the British colonial forces.

The school re-opened in October 1945 after the return of the Allied forces.

=== Nan Hwa Girls' High School (1956–1984) ===
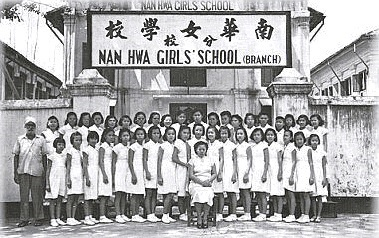
Nan Hwa Girls' School (Branch) at Bencoleen Street

The school's name was changed to Nan Hwa Girls' High School (simplified Chinese: 南华女子中学校; traditional Chinese: 南華女子中學校), in December 1956. During this period, the curriculum underwent much restructuring and the school emerged as one of the premier girls' schools in Singapore. The branch school was separated from the main school to function as a primary school, with its name changed to Nan Hwa Girls' Primary School (current Nan Hua Primary School). The Main School became a secondary school after it terminated the intake of primary pupils in 1964.

=== Restructuring as a government school (1984–2000) ===
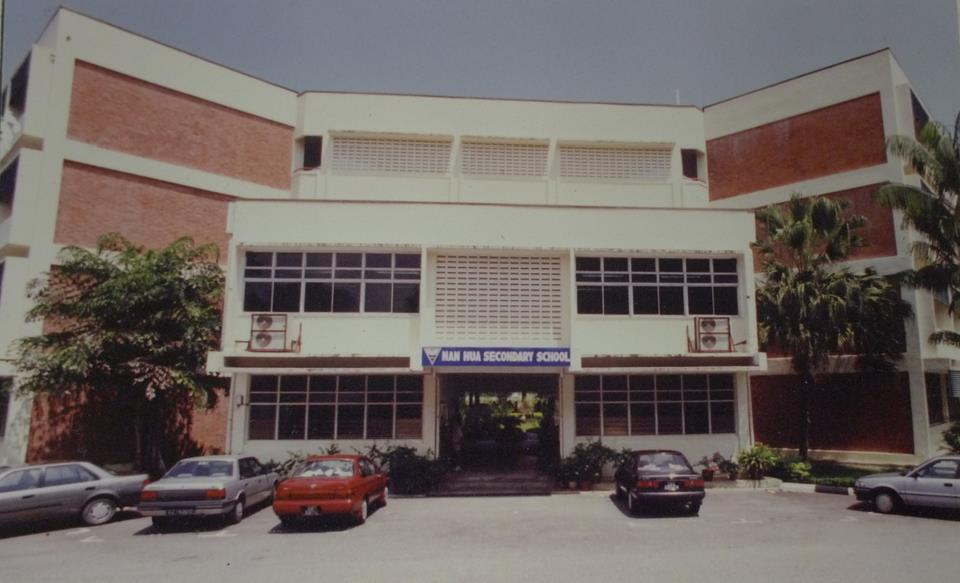
Former Nan Hua Secondary School campus from 1982 to 2003

On 12 December 1982, Nan Hwa Girls' High School moved from Adis Road to Clementi Avenue 1 on the recommendation of the Ministry of Education (MOE). The school began to admit Secondary One boys and thus became coeducational in 1984. The school was also renamed Nan Hua Secondary School, dropping the word "girls" in its name to reflect the change.

On 1 April 1986, the School Management Committee was dissolved and the school administration was handed over to the Ministry of Education, while the School Advisory Committee was formed to represent the interest of the school. This signified the change of the school from a Chinese medium school to an integrated secondary school utilising English as the medium of instruction. The move also ended the school's long-standing status as an aided school.

=== Attainment of SAP status (2000–present) ===
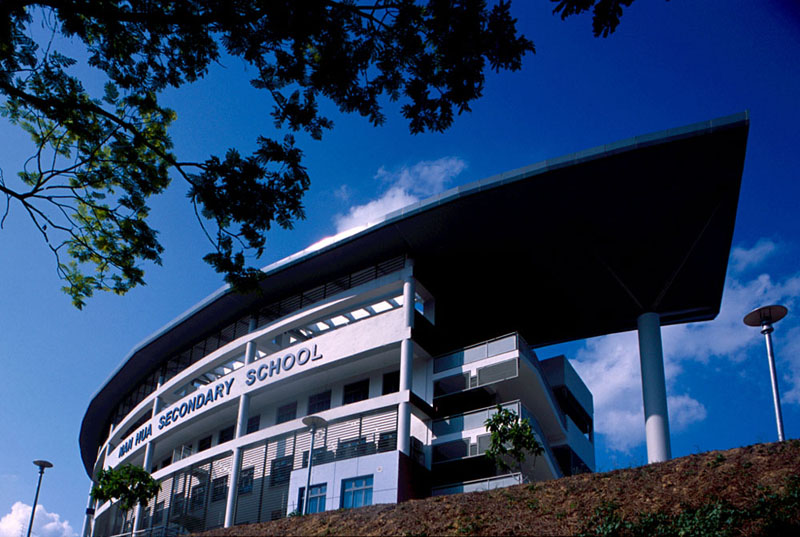
Former Nan Hua Secondary School in 2004.

In the new millennium, Nan Hua Secondary School was accorded as the 10th Special Assistance Plan school. Under the Programme for Rebuilding and Improving Existing Schools (PRIME), the school relocated to a new campus at 41 Clementi Avenue 1 on 20 December 2003. The former premises was occupied by the NUS High School of Math and Science. The school subsequently attained the School of Distinction Award and Singapore Quality Class Award in 2005. The new school building was officially opened by Prime Minister Lee Hsien Loong on 17 July 2005 when he declared Nan Hua Secondary School achieving its Autonomous Status in 2006. The school's name was changed to Nan Hua High School from 1 January 2006.

In 2010, Nan Hua High School received the President's Award for the Environment, the highest environment accolade for organisations and companies in Singapore. In 2017, Nan Hua High celebrated its 100th anniversary with a series of activities and celebrations throughout the year, culminating in the 100th Anniversary Dinner held on 15 July 2017.

== Campus ==
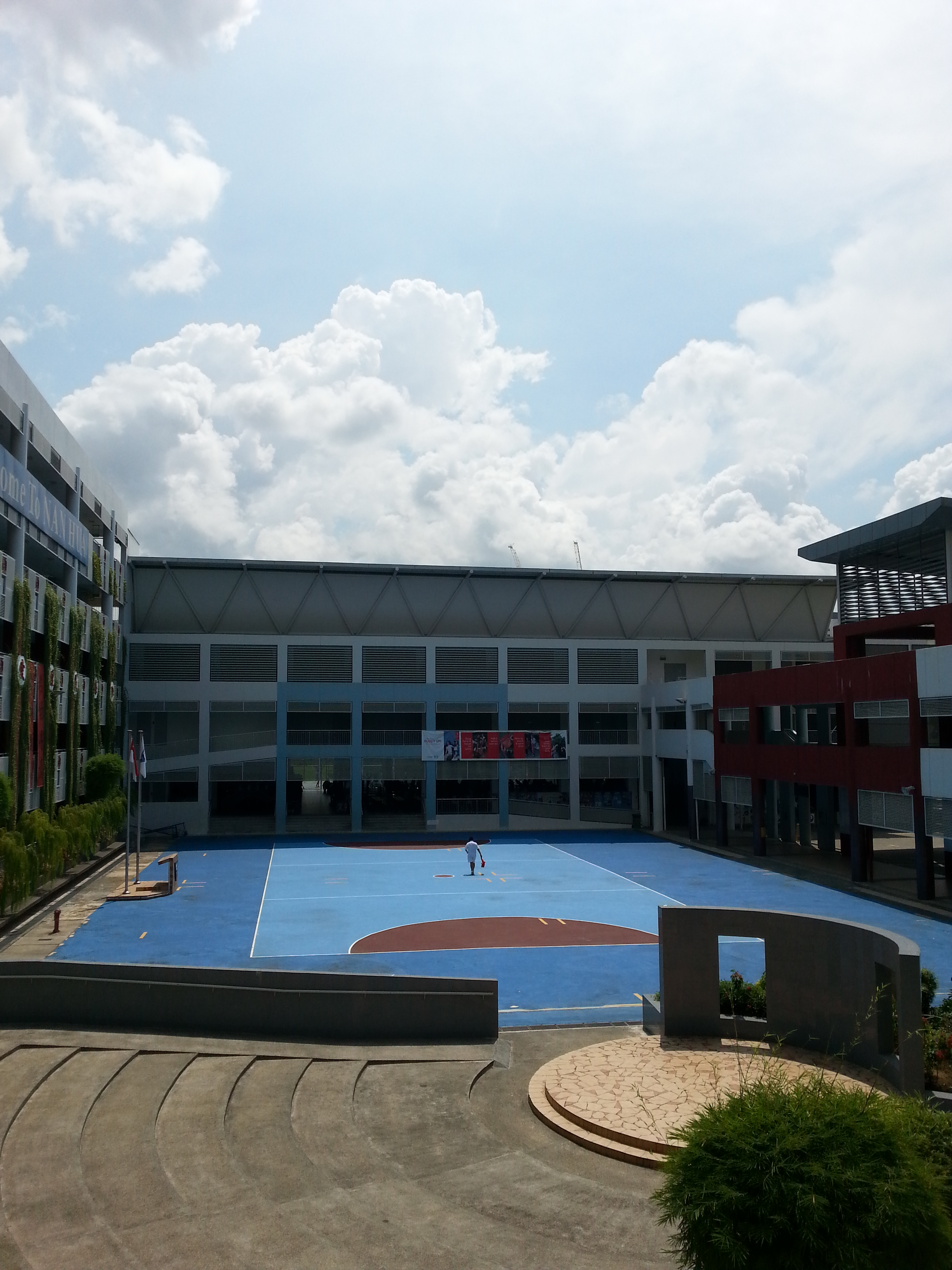
Nan Hua High School's campus

The school's campus lies on 292,710 square feet (27,194 m^{2}) of hill land at 41 Clementi Avenue 1.

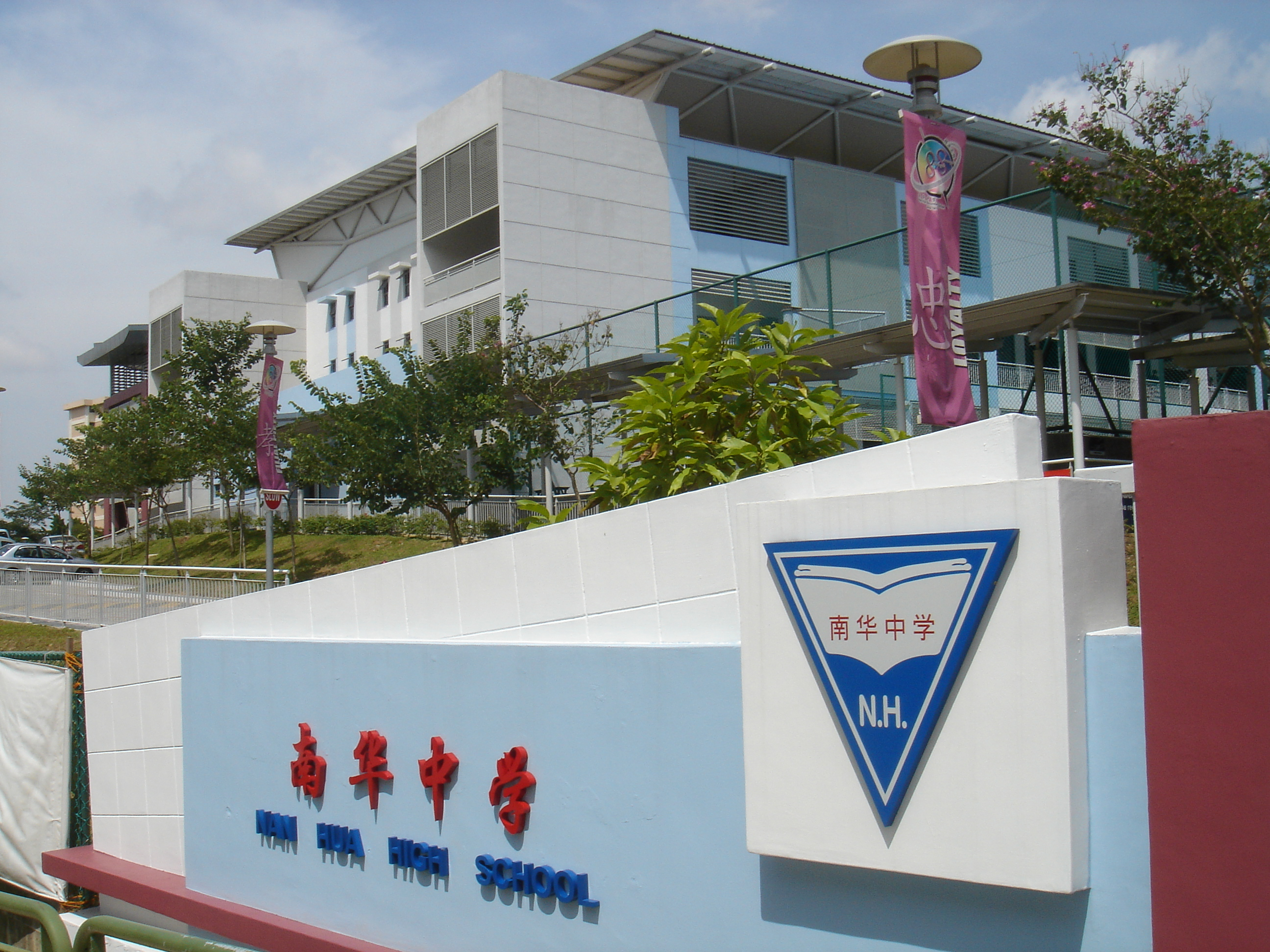
Campus entrance

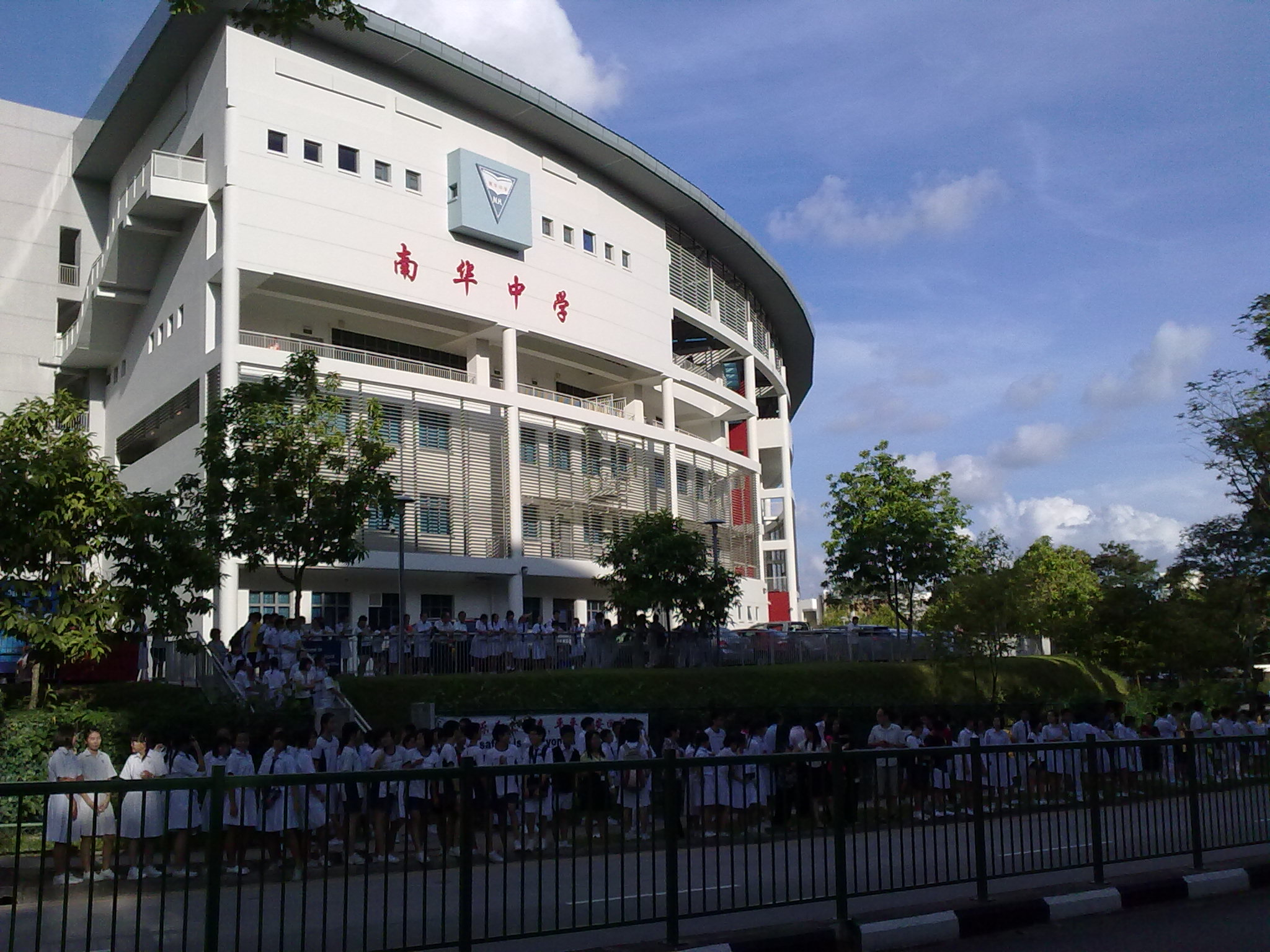
Front facade of the Admin & Aesthetics Block

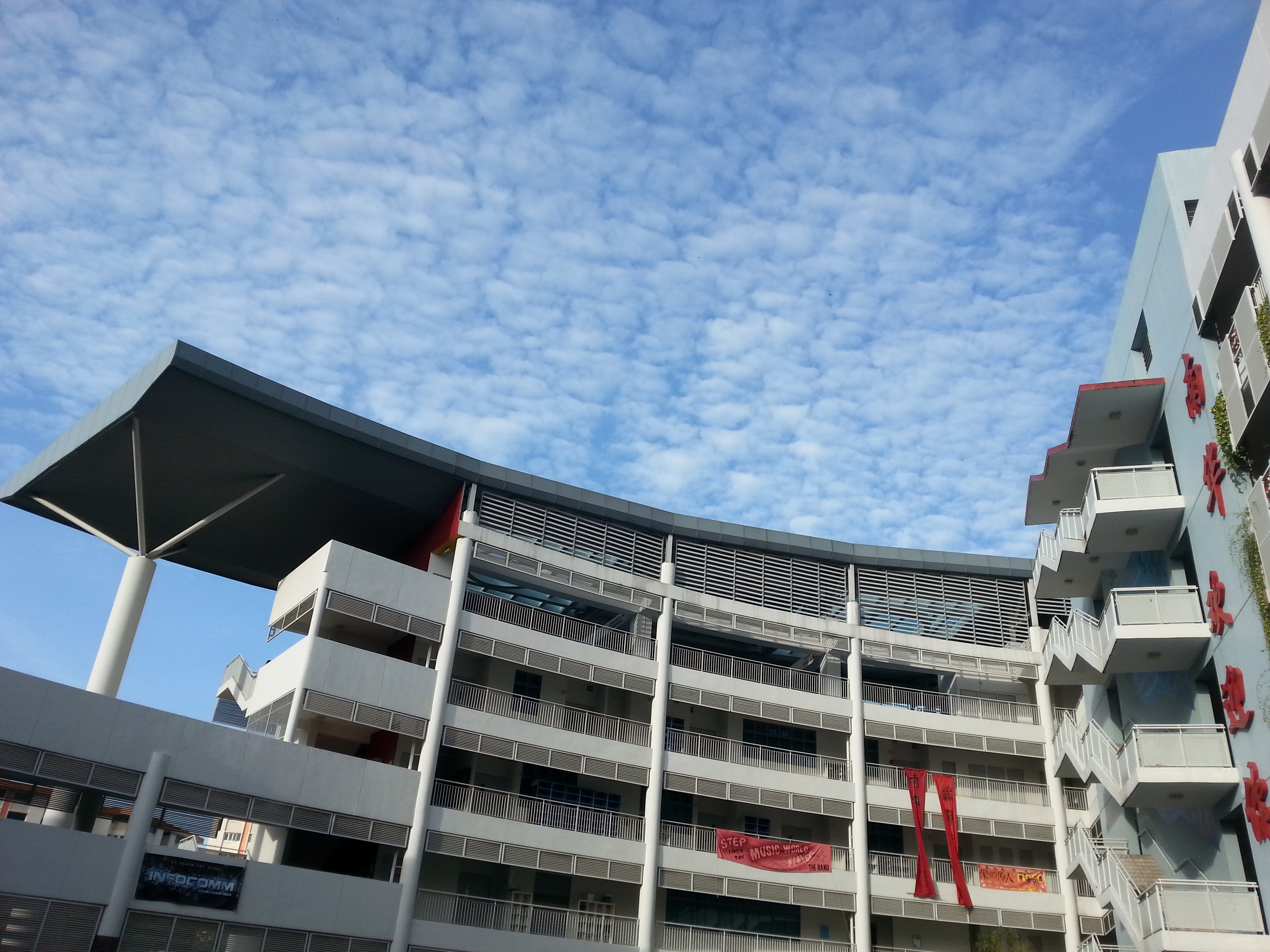
Rear facade of the Admin & Aesthetics Block

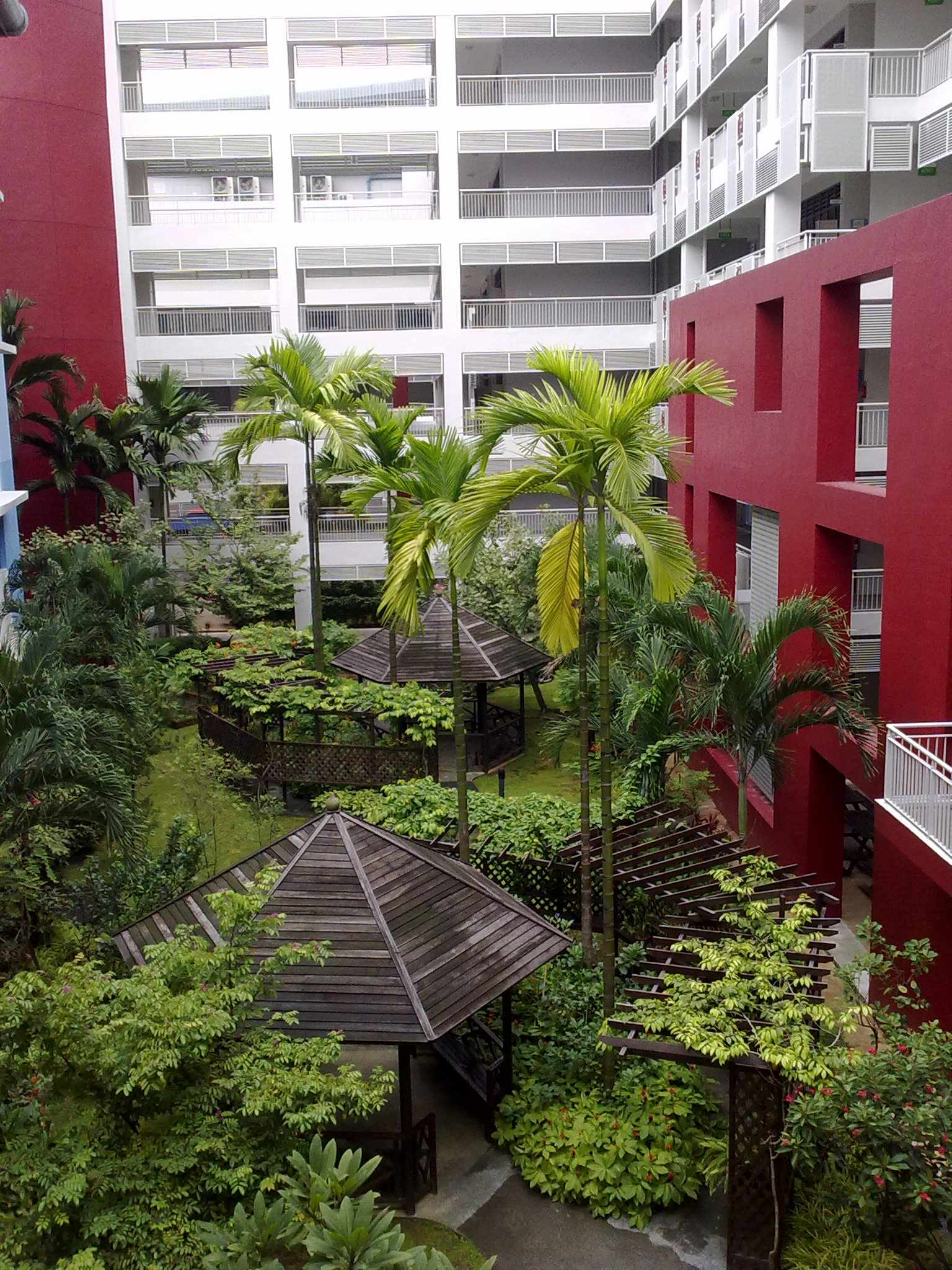
Eco-Garden

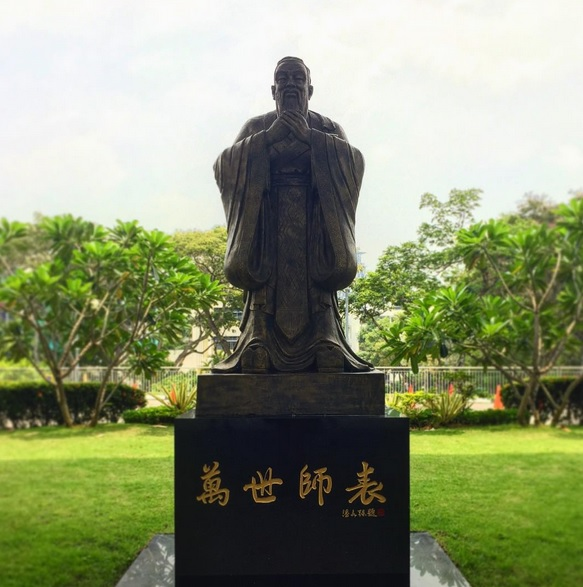
Statue of Confucius at the car porch

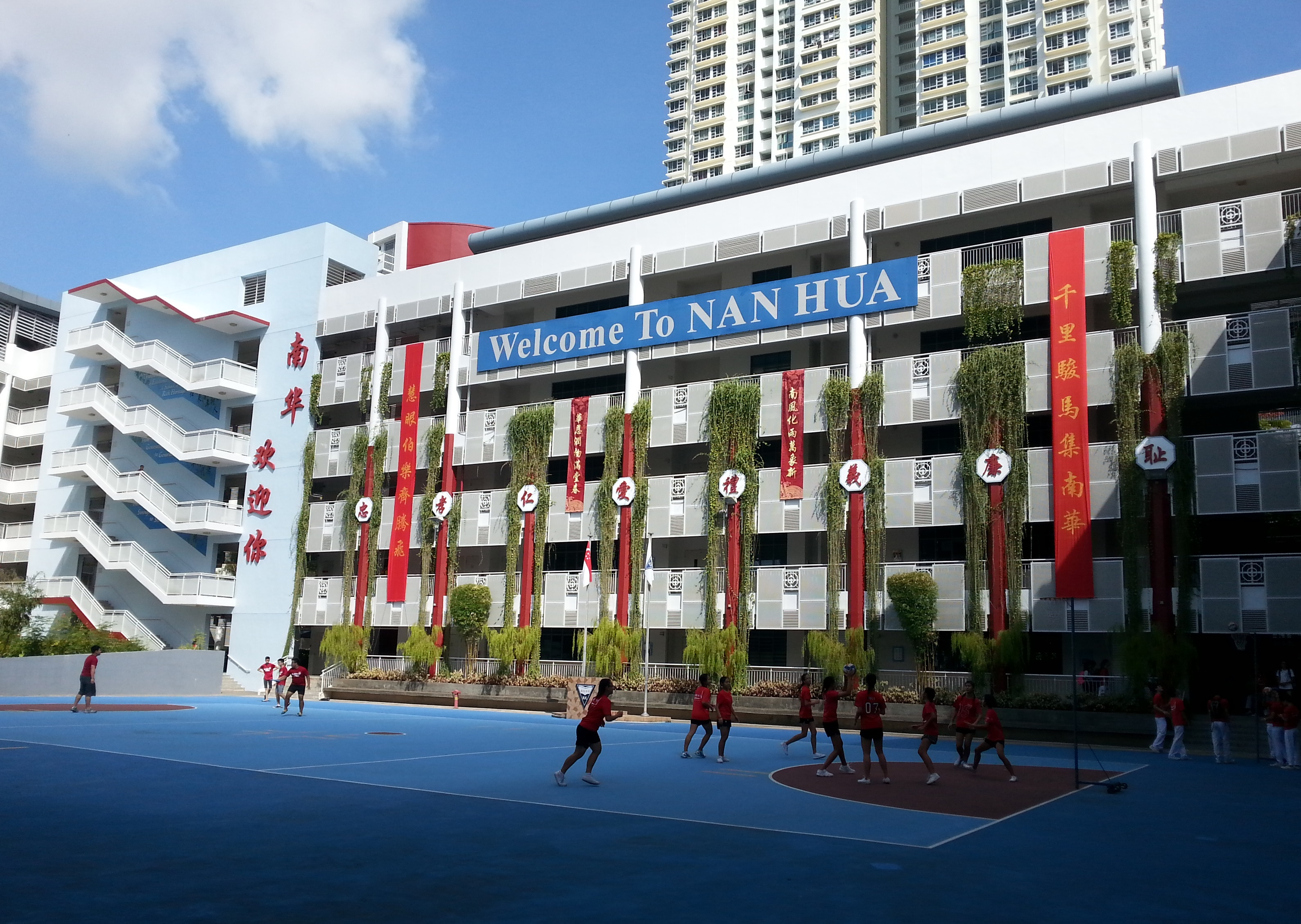
Science Block, with the Parade Square in the foreground

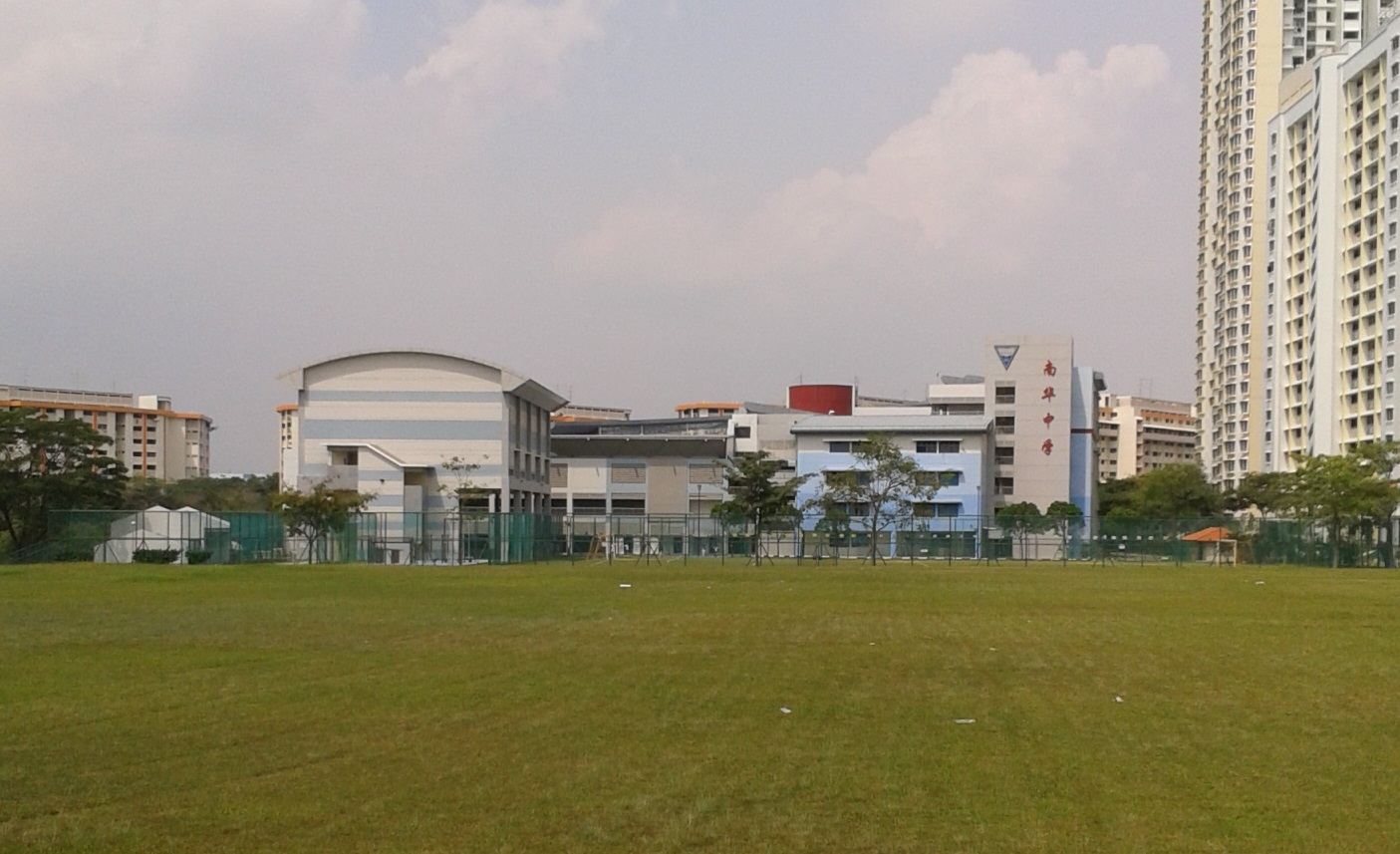
View of Nan Hua High School from Clementi Road

== Academics ==
=== O Level express course ===
Nan Hua High School offers the four-year Express course which leads up to the Singapore-Cambridge GCE Ordinary Level national examination. To build cross-cultural capabilities in a multi-racial society, Nan Hua also offers promising students the opportunity to study Malay under the Malay Special Programme (MSP).

=== SAP Flagship Programme ===
The SAP Flagship Programme (a programme offered at SAP schools) at Nan Hua High School is revolves around Chinese Culture and Bi-cultural Studies. Being the only SAP high school directly under the government, the programme is fully governed under the Ministry of Education, as opposed to independent and government-aided schools.

== Alumni ==
=== Notable alumni ===
- Don Wee: Member of Parliament for Chua Chu Kang GRC
- He Ying Ying, actress
- Hong Junyang, singer
- Lim Hwee Huang, interior designer
