= Yishun taxi driver murders =

1992 serial killings of taxi drivers in Singapore

- 59-year-old Teo Kim Hock, the second victim of the Yishun taxi killings
- Date: 18 April – 24 December 1992
- Location: Yishun, Singapore
- Outcome: Mohamad and Junalis arrested and charged for murdering Teo in 1992; Junalis indicted for murder of Seing in 1993; Mohamad and Junalis found guilty of murder and sentenced to death in 1994; Mohamad and Junalis executed by hanging at Changi Prison in 1995
- Deaths: Seing Koo Wan (58); Teo Kim Hock (59)
- Injuries: None
- Convicted: Mohamad Ashiek Salleh (20); Junalis Lumat (21)
- Verdict: Guilty
- Convictions: Murder
- Sentence: Death penalty

Between April 1992 and December 1992, there were two cases of taxi drivers being killed in Singapore, specifically in secluded areas of Yishun. The first was Seing Koo Wan (Chinese: 邢谷环; pinyin: Xíng Gǔhuán), a 58-year-old taxi driver who was found with several stab wounds on his body. Despite a police appeal, Seing's killer(s) was never found and the case remained unsolved for eight months before another taxi driver, Teo Kim Hock (Chinese: 张金福; pinyin: Zhāng Jīnfú; Pe̍h-ōe-jī: Tiuⁿ Kim-hok), was allegedly kidnapped by two men who demanded a ransom from his family. However, in truth, 59-year-old Teo was killed before the calls for ransom arrived.

Upon the arrest of Teo's two killers, the police made connections between the cases of Teo and Seing and concluded that it was committed by the same person(s). The two men - Mohamad Ashiek Salleh (also spelt Mohamed Ashiek Salleh) and Junalis Lumat (also spelt Junalis Lumut) - were both charged with Teo's killing, while Junalis alone faced a second murder charge for Seing's killing. Both men were sentenced to hang by the trial court in March 1994, and they were both put to death at Changi Prison on 16 June 1995.

== Killing of Seing Koo Wan ==
Seing Koo Wan, the 58-year-old taxi driver found murdered at Yishun

On 17 April 1992, at the deserted outskirts of Yishun, 58-year-old Seing Koo Wan was found dead inside his taxi, which was abandoned at the area itself. Seing was found with seventeen stab wounds on his body, and no murder weapon was found. The police classified the case as murder, and they did not rule out robbery. According to Seing's widow (a housewife), her husband had worked for twelve years as a taxi driver who worked in the night shift. She stated that her husband would often generously allow free rides for passengers who cannot afford the fare, and he would not have resisted if he ever encountered a robbery. Seing's two sons, aged 22 and 24 respectively, and Seing's own friends and colleagues also stated that Seing was a good father and co-worker and never had grudges with other people, hence they ruled out the killing as one due to hatred, and he was supposed to go to a seminar the day before he was killed. At the time of his death, Seing was survived by his wife and two sons.

The unsolved murder of Seing was re-enacted in November of the same year by Crimewatch, in which the police put out a public appeal for information to solve the case, in addition to the re-enactment of an unrelated case of Lim Hwee Huang, who was raped and killed in November 1984 by Hensley Anthony Neville (who was executed on 28 August 1992). It was noted that by November 1992, a total of 37 taxi robberies occurred in the year 1992 itself, which was a significant drop from previous years of 1990 and 1991 (where 79 and 76 taxi robberies occurred respectively), and out of these 1992 cases, Seing was so far the only taxi driver to be killed.

== Killing of Teo Kim Hock ==
On 24 December 1992, eight months after the murder of Seing Koo Wan, while 28-year-old Teo Wee San was at home in Hougang, he received a phone call from someone demanding ransom from him. From the caller, Teo Wee San received word that his 59-year-old father Teo Kim Hock, who worked as a taxi driver, was kidnapped by the caller and thus Teo's son should pay up to ensure Teo's safe return. A request by Teo's son to talk to his father was rejected. The caller claimed he was a loan shark, and that Teo had a friend who borrowed S$12,000 from him in the past but never returned it, so Teo, who acted as the friend's guarantor, was to pay up on the friend's behalf.

Subsequently, the police were contacted and they monitored the situation thoroughly. Subsequently, on 25 December, the caller made another phone call to ask Teo's son to bring a sum of S$10,000 and meet him at an Orchard Road shopping centre, but the son did not see anyone when he arrived there with the ransom money. Just a short time after the phone call was made, the police spotted a man behaving suspiciously and watching the Teo family's movements, and thus they arrested the 21-year-old man, who had a previous conviction for housebreaking. The suspect, later identified as Junalis Lumat, led police to a deserted outskirt in Yishun, where they found both Teo's abandoned taxi and Teo's corpse. According to the pathologist Wee Keng Poh, Teo died from strangulation just 24 hours before, and he was killed before the ransom demand was made.

Subsequently, Junalis's accomplice Mohamad Ashiek Salleh, who was then 20 years old and unemployed, was also arrested at his Bedok flat. Both Mohamad and Junalis were charged with murder for Teo's death on 27 December 1992. Subsequently, on 7 January 1993, after investigations revealed that Junalis was responsible for the first killing of Seing Koo Wan back in April 1992, the prosecution also tendered a second preliminary charge of murder against Junalis for murdering Seing. If found guilty of murder, both Junalis and Mohamad would face capital punishment in Singapore.

The rising cases of taxi drivers being violently killed during robberies between 1991 and 1993 had also incurred concerns from the public about the safety of taxi drivers during their line of work.

== Trial and sentencing ==
Junalis Lumat, the first accused who faced two charges of murder for killing Seing Koo Wan and Teo Kim Hock.

Mohamad Ashiek Salleh, the second accused who faced a single charge of murder for killing Teo Kim Hock.

On 23 February 1994, both 22-year-old Junalis Lumat and 21-year-old Mohamad Ashiek Salleh stood trial at the High Court for the murder of 59-year-old Teo Kim Hock. Although there was sufficient evidence, the second charge against Junalis for killing 58-year-old Seing Koo Wan was temporarily stood down in view of his trial sessions for Teo's killing. Junalis was represented by Ahmad Khamis (later replaced by James Masih) while Mohamad was represented by Subhas Anandan in the trial, and Justice S. Rajendran was the trial judge who heard the case. Bala Reddy prosecuted both Junalis and Mohamad in the case.

It was revealed that both Mohamad and Junalis were in need of money and could not find a job, which was why they decided to rob taxi drivers, and even bought nylon rope, two pairs of gloves and a toy gun. Both Junalis and Mohamad put up a defence that they never intended to kill Teo but to rob him. They stated that on the day of the murder, they boarded Teo's taxi and as it drove to a secluded area in Yishun, they used a toy gun to threaten Teo, who was told to surrender his wallet and he was tied up. While Teo was tied up, he struggled and screamed out of fear, and the two robbers were sent into a panic, which made them used a yellow nylon rope to tie around the mouth but due to Teo's struggles, it unexpectedly slipped tightly around Teo's neck and suffocated him to death. Both men stated that after they abandoned Teo's corpse and taxi, they stole S$200 from his possessions and divided it between themselves.

The prosecution argued otherwise that the two men had intentionally strangled Teo with the nylon rope and they had done so with considerable force based on the forensic findings of Dr Wee Keng Poh, and thus argued that the murder charge was substantiated against both Junalis and Mohamad. A government psychiatrist Chee Kuan Tse was also summoned to court by the prosecution to testify against Junalis, who added in his testimony that he was suffering from depression at the time of the crime. They also stated that from the men's stealing of Teo's driver license and identity card (both recovered), it was clear that both men did not want the police to identify Teo and wanted to cover up the death of Teo.

On 10 March 1994, Justice S. Rajendran rejected the defences of both Junalis Lumat and Mohamad Ashiek Salleh, and therefore found both of them guilty of murder, and both men were sentenced to death.

== Appeals and executions ==
On 17 September 1994, both Mohamad and Junalis sought to appeal to overturn their convictions and death sentences for killing Teo Kim Hock, but the Court of Appeal dismissed the appeals.

On 10 October 1994, the prosecution applied for the second murder charge against Junalis for the murder of Seing Koo Wan to be withdrawn since Junalis's death sentence for Teo's murder had been upheld through appeal and Junalis would still be hanged even if he was found guilty of Seing's murder. The application was granted, which effectively acquitted Junalis of killing Seing despite committing it. Subsequently, both Mohamad and Junalis appealed to then President of Singapore Ong Teng Cheong for presidential clemency, which would allow them to commute their sentences to life imprisonment if successful. However, President Ong refused to grant them a pardon and hence rejected their pleas.

On the Friday morning of 16 June 1995, 23-year-old Mohamad Ashiek Salleh and 24-year-old Junalis Lumat were both hanged at Changi Prison. On the same day itself, two more death row prisoners - 27-year-old mechanic Chan Hock Wai who trafficked 149.84g of heroin, and 37-year-old Phua Soy Boon who killed 50-year-old contractor Sim Ah Lek - were executed at the same timing.

The case was re-enacted by Crimewatch in 1996 as the second episode of the show's annual season.

== See also ==
- Capital punishment in Singapore
