= Murder of Sim Ah Lek =

1993 murder of a moneylender at Jurong, Singapore

Sim Ah Lek
- Born: Sim Ah Lek c. 1943; Syonan, Empire of Japan
- Died: 14 July 1993 (aged 50); Jurong, Singapore
- Cause of death: Two neck wounds resulting in death by excessive blood loss
- Occupations: Contractor; Illegal moneylender
- Known for: Murder victim
- Children: 4

On 14 July 1993, 50-year-old sub-contractor Sim Ah Lek (Chinese: 沈亚利; pinyin: Shěn Yàlì; Pe̍h-ōe-jī: Sím A-lī), who was also a moneylender, was killed by 37-year-old Phua Soy Boon (Chinese: 潘瑞文; pinyin: Pān Ruìwén; Pe̍h-ōe-jī: Phoaⁿ Sūi-bûn), after Sim refused to lend Phua S$10,000. After killing Sim, Phua stole Sim's Rolex watch, diamond ring and S$9,000 in cash, and even stuffed the dead body inside a gunny sack before disposing of it at Jurong Swimming Complex, where it was found the next morning.

After 39 hours of police investigations, Phua was arrested and charged three days after the murder, and despite putting up a defence of an accidental killing, Phua was found guilty of murder and condemned to death on 6 May 1994. Phua was hanged at Changi Prison on 16 June 1995 after failing to overturn his death sentence through appeal.

== Discovery of Sim's body ==
On the morning of 15 July 1993, a passer-by discovered a gunny sack at a carpark, and the sack contained the body of a man with his neck slashed and his hands bound with string. The body was partially stuffed inside the sack, and a bloodstained shoeprint was discovered nearby the crime scene.

The victim was identified as 50-year-old Sim Ah Lek, who worked as a contractor and also engaged in illegal money lending activities. Sim, who was married with four children, did not return home for the night and he was therefore reported missing four hours before his body was discovered. It was deduced by police that the murder did not take place at the complex since there were signs that the body was moved here after the killing took place somewhere else. Sim's Rolex watch, a diamond ring and a total of S$9,000 in cash were missing.

According to his family, neighbors and friends, Sim was polite and kind, and never had any conflicts with people over money. They also stated that it was shocking that someone would violently kill Sim. Five of Sim's friends and relatives, including his nephew, tried to identify the body but they were not allowed to enter the crime scene. Sim's wife said that she last saw her husband going out for an appointment but she never knew who was he meeting, and Sim's nephew said that Sim would not make appointments with anyone except for people he personally knew.

== Arrest of suspect ==
On 16 July 1993, a day after the discovery of the body, a 36-year-old suspect was arrested for killing Sim Ah Lek, after 39 hours of police investigations. The suspect, Phua Soy Boon, a jobless Singaporean who lived at a flat in Jurong's Yung Kuang Road, was charged on 17 July 1993 with murder. Phua was interviewed after the phone records recovered by the police showed that Phua was the last person to call Sim before his death, and they arrested Phua at his home after the police discovered a bloodstained pair of shorts inside his washing machine and a few more bloodstains at the kitchen. Sim's missing watch, ring and S$6,000 in cash were also recovered, and there were also bloodstains found on the stolen money. It was also mentioned in the charge sheet that Phua had killed Sim inside his home at Yung Kuang Road.

Phua made a confession after his arrest, admitting that he killed Sim, from whom he borrowed a sum of S$30,000 before. He admitted that he began to gamble since the end of his National Service and the time he worked at his mother's hawker stall. He stated that he started borrowing money from loan sharks to feed his gambling habit and solve his bad financial situation, which worsened after his mother fell ill and passed on the hawker job to his eldest brother, and this also made him lose his job. Phua added that his financial situation worsened to the extent that he had to borrow from his two elder brothers, the younger of whom worked as a police officer. His total debt amounted to more than S$10,000.

Phua recounted to the police that on the day of the murder, he invited Sim to his home, wanting to borrow another S$10,000 from Sim, due to his need for money to pay his father's medical fees. However, not only did Sim refused to lend Phua the money, he even confronted him and demanded that he return to him the sum of S$30,000 that he owed Sim. Having no other options left and being pushed to his limits, Phua decided to, in a spur of moment, rob Sim of his valuables and took a chopper from his kitchen to threaten Sim to hand over his watch and money. However, Sim tried to run to the gate of Phua's flat, and therefore, Phua used the chopper to inflict two blows at Sim on the neck, resulting in Sim to die from his neck wounds. Phua even took away Sim's Rolex watch, diamond ring and S$9,000 in cash. Phua had used the stolen cash to pay off his debts he owed to his brothers, and the money were recovered from them.

As for how Phua disposed of the corpse, he stated that he stuffed the body inside a gunny sack, and borrowed a truck from his friend, which he drove to Jurong Swimming Complex, where he threw the gunny sack containing Sim's body at the same place where it was discovered.

== Trial of Phua Soy Boon ==
1993 police mugshot of the killer, Phua Soy Boon

On 19 April 1994, 36-year-old Phua Soy Boon stood trial at the High Court for killing Sim Ah Lek. Phua was represented by defence lawyer Choo Han Teck, while the trial prosecutors were P. Arul Selvamalar and Kan Shuk Weng of the Attorney-General's Chambers. The trial judge was Judicial Commissioner M P H Rubin.

In his court testimony however, Phua recanted parts of his account on what happened. He stated that on the day of the murder, Sim came to his doorstep unannounced and he demanded Phua to return him the S$30,000 he owed to Sim, and even fought with him after he insulted both Phua and his father. Phua said he picked up a chopper and threatened Sim to leave his flat, but Sim continued to be defiant and picked up a chair to attack Phua, who then inflicted the first blow on Sim's neck, and later on, Sim again resisted, resulting in Phua once again bringing the chopper down to his neck and led to Sim to die from excessive blood loss. Based on this, Phua's lawyer Choo argued that the benefit of the doubt should be given to his client since he killed Sim in a fight and it was an accidental killing, and sought for the reduction of the murder charge to one of culpable homicide not amounting to murder or causing death by a rash act.

In rebuttal, the prosecution argued that Phua had intentionally inflicted the two knife wounds on Sim's neck, as they relied on the pathologist's evidence that the two wounds measured 5 cm and 7 cm depth, and measured 11 cm and 22.5 cm long respectively, which cut through the nerves, major blood vessels and muscles, and caused hurt to the vertebrae, which indicated that these deep neck wounds were not inflicted accidentally or during a fight. They also pointed out that Phua took away the deceased's belongings, which showed he had robbery in his mind when he fatally chopped Sim and he even calmly disposed of the corpse after the grisly killing. Therefore, they sought both a guilty verdict of murder and the death penalty for Phua.

On 6 May 1994, Justice Rubin delivered his judgement. He stated in his verdict that he accepted the prosecution's submissions that Phua had indeed wilfully inflicted the fatal wounds on Sim, and did not accept the defence of sudden fight or accidental killing pressed by Phua's lawyer. Therefore, Justice Rubin found 36-year-old Phua Soy Boon guilty of murder and sentenced him to death. According to news reports, Phua was expressionless during sentencing and only stared at his family (who were present in court) before being led away by police.

== Execution ==
On 15 August 1994, Phua's appeal against his conviction and sentence was dismissed by the Court of Appeal. Without asking for the prosecution's reply, Chief Justice Yong Pung How, who heard the appeal together with two other Judges of Appeal L P Thean and M Karthigesu, dismissed the claims that Phua had accidentally inflicted the two fatal wounds and had no motive to commit murder, and therefore rejected Phua's appeal. Subsequently, Phua's death row plea for clemency was also turned down by the President of Singapore.

On 16 June 1995, for the charge of murdering Sim Ah Lek, 37-year-old Phua Soy Boon was put to death by hanging. On that same day at Changi Prison (where Phua was executed), three other prisoners - 27-year-old mechanic Chan Hock Wai who imported 149.84g of heroin, and two taxi robbers Junalis Lumat and Mohamad Ashiek Salleh who killed a taxi driver - were also hanged.

In September 1996, Singaporean crime show Crimewatch re-enacted the Sim Ah Lek murder case and aired it on television.

== See also ==
- Capital punishment in Singapore
