= Industrial Arbitration Court =

Singapore court for resolving trade disputes

- Interactive map of Industrial Arbitration Court
- 1°17′26″N 103°51′03″E
- Established: 24 October 1960; 66 years ago
- Jurisdiction: Singapore
- Location: 1 Supreme Court Lane #B1-45; Singapore 178879
- Coordinates: 1°17′26″N 103°51′03″E
- Composition method: Judges are appointed by the President upon the recommendation of the Prime Minister
- Authorised by: Industrial Relations Act 1960
- Website: https://www.iac.gov.sg/

President
- Currently: Justice See Kee Oon
- Since: 4 January 2025

Deputy President
- Currently: Justice Christopher Tan Pheng Wee

The Industrial Arbitration Court is an industrial court in Singapore and an organ of state. The court certifies collective agreements and arbitrates industrial disputes.

== History ==
=== Background ===
On 13 January 1960, Minister for Labour and Minister for Law K. M. Byrne tabled the Industrial Relations Bill in the 2nd Legislative Assembly, which repealed the Industrial Courts Ordinance and Wages Councils Ordinance, and proposed the establishment of the Industrial Arbitration Court. The court was authorised to resolve disputes between employers and employees, recommend salary scales, and severance or retirement packages.

On 27 January 1960, Charles Gamba, an economist, said that the bill was "one of the most important economic and social agencies that would be created in Singapore", and that the court would confirm impartiality in industrial disputes. He also said that the industrial court was the first of its kind in Southeast Asia.

On 6 February 1960, the Singapore Employers Federation wrote a 13-page memorandum to Byrne, saying that as seen in other Asian countries, the bill would not ensure a "real and lasting" industrial peace, due to the lack of compulsory arbitration. The Federation also called for an appointment of a permanent deputy president, instead of an acting president during the absence of the president. On the same day, the Singapore Maritime Employers Federation also said that seafarers should be excluded from the bill, due to the international nature of seafaring.

On 10 February 1960, the bill was read a second time. Lim Yew Hock and A. P. Rajah felt that due to the importance of the bill, it should be referred to a select committee. In response, Lee Kuan Yew said that "careful consideration" had been given, and that sending the bill to a select committee would have delayed it for "three or four months". The conclusion was that the bill should be enacted quicker, so that the court could begin its work towards industrial peace, and Byrne would have a better possibility of implementing the government's labour policy. On 13 February 1960, the bill was passed and was known as the Industrial Relations Ordinance, 1960.

=== Establishment ===
In March 1960, Byrne announced that the court would be housed within the Supreme Court building, to "keep the dignity and prestige" of the court. Following a government ruling that no official of a political party or assemblyman "may sit on a judicial or quasi-judicial tribunal", he said that the industrial court would not be affected by this ruling, as the court was not a court of judicature like "other judicial or quasi-judicial bodies".

On 20 June 1960, Goh Liang Chuan, permanent secretary to the Ministry of Labour and Ministry of Law, was directed by Byrne to seek assistance from the Commonwealth Conciliation and Arbitration Commission (CCAC) under the Colombo Plan for setting up the court. S. G. Hastings, deputy industrial registrar of CCAC, was seconded from Australia to Singapore for three months from July 1960. On 20 July 1960, Hastings arrived in Singapore, and stayed at the Adelphi Hotel.

Due to a delay in moving into the Supreme Court building, as the previous occupants did not move out on time, the court was unable to function before Hasting's three month secondment ended. As such, on 17 August 1960, Goh requested a one month extension for Hasting's secondment.

On 14 September 1960, Gamba, who was also an economics lecturer at the University of Malaya in Singapore, was appointed as the first president of the court. Gamba was given permission by the University to assume the role of president, and resigned from the University in March 1961. On 15 September 1960, the Department of External Affairs approved the extension, which meant that Hasting was expected to stay till 19 November 1960. On 21 September 1960, Byrne clarified that Gamba was not a member of the governing People's Action Party following opposition-initiated questions over his appointment.

On 14 October 1960, Richard Teo Chan Hong, Singapore's seventh magistrate, was appointed as registrar of the court.

=== Inauguration ===
The court was inaugurated on 24 October 1960. On 2 November 1960, the court heard its first case, Holywood Theatres Ltd v Singapore General Employees' Union. Represented by Dominic Puthucheary, the employees alleged that the theatre became "highly hostile and vindictive" when they filed a claim with the court for wage improvement. During the hearing, the theatre, represented by J. J. Rattray, said that they may be forced to close, as they could not afford to pay for any wage increases. Gamba, assisted by James Puthucheary and G. C. Thio, awarded monthly wage increases to the employees, which ranged from S$5 to S$20.

In January 1962, Gamba released the court's first annual report in the 2nd Legislative Assembly, which highlighted the appointment of three industrial relations officers, who have the ability to speak in one or two Chinese dialects, Malay and Tamil, aimed at helping smaller employers and unions. The report also showed that 121 agreements covering 36,269 workers have been certified by the court since its inauguration.

On 10 July 1962, an amendment to the ordinance was passed to allow for the establishment of a second industrial arbitration court, due to the increase of cases seen by the present court. The second court was housed within the Central Provident Fund building. On 22 October 1962, Tan Boon Chiang was appointed as deputy president of the court, and presided over the second court.

On 7 April 1963, Gamba released the court's second annual report, and said that the year was a "most satisfactory state of affairs" as about 65,000 workers were covered by agreements certified by the court.

On 15 September 1964, Tan became acting president of IAC, succeeding Charles Gamba. Without a new deputy president appointed, there was a backlog of a 121 trade disputes in February 1965. In March 1965, Devan Nair criticised the government for the delay, and said that "a deputy president has got to be appointed without further delay". On 10 June 1965, S. Natarajan, an accountant, was appointed as deputy president, and the second court resumed operations.

In December 1965, Minister for Labour Jek Yeun Thong announced amendments to the Industrial Relations Ordinance, to empower the court to propose a new collective agreement by a trade union, and extend an existing agreement by an employer, under a situation where both parties are unable to reach an agreement by themselves.

=== Later years ===
In April 1968, the National Trades Union Congress criticised the court for delay in its decisions with disputes.

On 10 July 1968, another amendment bill was tabled in the 2nd Parliament. Major amendments were added in this bill. In the 1967 annual report, released in July 1968, Tan called for the improvement of advocacy in court by employers and trade unions.

On 2 January 1970, the second court was closed, due to the retirement of Natarajan, and the calmness in the labour force.

On 2 March 1987, the court moved from the third floor of the Supreme Court to the fourth floor of City Hall. In June 1988, the court moved to the second floor.

In October 1991, the court criticised the Ministry of Finance for preventing immigration officers with lower education qualifications from receiving increased salaries, negotiated by the Amalgamated Union of Public Employees.

In October 1993, the court mandated that all data related to collective agreements must be submitted on a 5 1/4-inch (130 mm) floppy disk, together with the original copy of the collective agreement.

== Composition and powers ==
Under the Industrial Relations Ordinance, (Note: Later replaced by the Industrial Relations Act, after the independence of Singapore.) the court consists of a president and two other members. The president was appointed by the Yang di-Pertuan Negara, under the advice of the Prime Minister. The president is not deemed to be a public servant, but has "the same rights, privileges, protection and immunity" as a judge of the Supreme Court. After the independence of Singapore, the court's president is appointed by the President of Singapore.

The court certifies collective agreements and arbitrates industrial disputes, maintaining overall industrial peace and stability in Singapore. Serious disputes are referred to the court, after failing resolution via conciliation at the Ministry of Manpower.

While a dispute is in front of the court and pending review, neither party may resort to economic force, encouraging collective bargaining without threats of force. However, strike action and lockout has been identified as "essential elements" of the collective bargaining process, and true collective bargaining does not exist without them. It is argued that the ordinance was not designed for "true collective bargaining" in this sense. The Attorney-General or the Minister of Labour is empowered to intervene on behalf of the government, and force a settlement out of public interest.

== Notable cases ==
- Life Insurance Corporation of India v Singapore Insurance Companies Employees' Union (1962): Employer was allowed to make dispute claim on behalf of the employees' union.
- Singapore Airlines v Singapore Airlines Staff Union and Singapore Airport Terminal Services Workers' Union (1992): Employer was not allowed to cap salary increments and bonuses to productivity of the airline.
- Singapore Airlines v Air Line Pilots' Association Singapore (2007): The court ruled that the airline was required to pay Airbus A380 pilots more than Boeing 747-400 pilots. A380 captains and first officers were paid S$700 and S$450 more respectively.
- SilkAir v Air Line Pilots' Association Singapore (2011): The court ruled in favour of the airline, denying the pilots' request for being paid flying allowance for all hours on duty, instead of hours in air.

== Membership ==
=== Presidents ===
List of presidents with years served
President	Years served	Notes
Charles Gamba	1960–1964	
Tan Boon Chiang	1965–1988	
Tan Teow Yeow	1988–1991	
Goh Phai Cheng	1991–1993	
Chao Hick Tin	1993–1999	
Lee Seiu Kin	1999–2002	
Tan Lee Meng	2002–2007	
Chan Seng Onn	2007–2021	
See Kee Oon	2021–present	

=== Deputy presidents ===
List of deputy presidents with years served
Deputy President	Years served	Notes
Tan Boon Chiang	1962–1964	
S. Natarajan	1965–1969	
Tan Lian Ker	1978–1984	
Richard Rokmat Magnus	1993–2006	
Hamzah Moosa	2006–2012	
Tan Siong Thye	2012–2014	
See Kee Oon	2014–2020	
Vincent Hoong	2020–2025	
Christopher Tan Pheng Wee	2025–present	
