= Murder of Wong Mee Hiong =

1990 case of a woman murdered in Katong, Singapore

- Date: 1 December 1990
- Location: Katong, Singapore
- Motive: Robbery, and to silence witnesses
- Deaths: Wong Mee Hiong, 20
- Convicted: Yap Biew Hian, 22
- Sentence: Death penalty

On 1 December 1990, at Singapore's Tanjong Katong Road, a 20-year-old Malaysian woman named Wong Mee Hiong (Chinese: 王美香; pinyin: Wáng Meǐxiāng; Pha̍k-fa-sṳ: Vòng Mî-hiông ) was stabbed to death inside her rented house and her body was wrapped in a blanket before being hidden in a storeroom. Wong's corpse was discovered by her fiancé and ten days after her killing, Wong's killer Yap Biew Hian (Chinese: 叶谋贤; pinyin: Yè Mǒuxián; Pe̍h-ōe-jī: Ia̍p Biô-hiân), a fellow tenant of the house and also a Malaysian, was arrested for the case and charged. Yap, who admitted to killing the victim with intent to rob her, was sentenced to death three years after he murdered Wong.

== Murder ==
On 2 December 1990, just less than an hour after midnight, 28-year-old Malaysian construction worker Ta Bee Fath discovered the corpse of his fiancée inside the storeroom of his rented house (where a total of twelve Malaysians rented and lived in). The victim was a 20-year-old Perak-born Malaysian named Wong Mee Hiong, who stayed together with her fiancé and was finding employment in Singapore at the time she died. Wong was stabbed three to four times on the chest and abdomen, and her body was wrapped in a bedsheet. Dr Clarence Tan, the forensic pathologist, certified that two of these knife wounds were fatal, as they both penetrated her chest and gone through her lungs.

The police investigated her death as murder, and during which, it was discovered that Wong's seven gold items, worth around SGD$1,100, were missing from the flat. One of the kitchen knives was bent and it was believed to be the murder weapon, hence the police retrieved it for investigation purposes. The bedsheet around Wong's body belonged to a male tenant who was not present at the house.

According to Wong's fiancé, he noticed something was amiss when his fiancée, whom he last saw in the morning and entrusted her to buy lottery numbers in the afternoon, was missing from the house at nighttime, and that he also spotted several bloodstains on her bed, which made him realize that something was wrong. It was also said that Wong was originally supposed to marry her fiancé in 1991, and due to her murder, the younger brother of Wong's fiancé, whose marriage was to take place the following week, had to postpone his marriage plans in view of Wong's murder.

== Arrest of suspect ==
On 10 December 1990, the police stated that they arrested a suspect at the railway station, after the man returned from Malaysia. The man was said to be a tenant of the house where Wong Mee Hiong and her fiancé lived, and believed to be the person who murdered Wong. They also seized his pawn ticket and traced the missing gold items to two pawnshops at Chinatown.

A day after his capture, the suspect, 22-year-old Yap Biew Hian, a Selangor-born Malaysian and shipyard worker, was charged with murder.

== Trial and aftermath ==
For the charge of murdering Wong Mee Hiong, Yap Biew Hian stood trial at the High Court on 8 March 1993. Yap was represented by Choo Han Teck, while the prosecution was led by Mathavan Devadas. The case was presided by Justice Lai Kew Chai.

During the proceedings, Yap's police statements were read out, revealing that on the day of the murder, Yap decided to commit theft. Seeing that Wong was sleeping inside the bedroom she shared with her boyfriend, Yap selected her as a target, using an adjustable spanner to strike Wong on the head several times before brandishing a knife to stab her three or four times on the chest and abdomen. Yap said that Wong continued to move despite the assault, and it prompted him to plunge the knife into her abdomen and chest until he was certain that Wong died. Yap also described how he used his bed sheet to wrap the body and concealed it in the storeroom before he escaped to Malaysia, but not before pawning Wong's gold items at Chinatown. However, in court, Yap recanted the part where he stabbed the victim, and he testified that while he did intend to steal Wong's valuables and thus used the spanner to assault her, he did not remember why did he took a knife to stab her.

On 10 March 1993, Yap Biew Hian was found guilty of murder and sentenced to death. Justice Lai stated in his judgement that he did not believe Yap's claim that his intention was solely to rob the victim but not kill her, and two of the injuries he inflicted were sufficient in the ordinary course of nature to cause death and the stabbing was done in furtherance of his intent to commit robbery. Therefore, Yap's defences were not accepted, and it led to his conviction for murder and death sentence. According to news reports, Yap was expressionless during his sentencing. His mother and other relatives were present in court, and Yap's mother cried upon hearing that her son received a death sentence for killing Wong, and she had to be escorted by relatives out of the courtroom.

Yap was one of the four people to receive the death penalty within a short span of three days during that week itself; one of these remaining three condemned was Angel Mou Pui-peng, who was convicted of trafficking 4kg of diamorphine, and Mou was hanged on 6 January 1995 after losing her appeal.

On 11 October 1993, seven months after receiving the death sentence, Yap lost his appeal against the trial decision. The Court of Appeal's three judges - S Rajendran, L P Thean and Warren Khoo - affirmed Justice Lai's finding that Yap had intentionally inflicted the fatal injuries on Wong, which in turn caused her death, rendering Yap guilty of murder under the law, and hence they dismissed his appeal. Since then, Yap was hanged at Changi Prison.

== See also ==
- Capital punishment in Singapore
