= Kallang Bahru rape and murder =

1984 rape and murder of a woman at Singapore's Kallang Bahru

Lim Hwee Huang
- Lim Hwee Huang, the victim who was raped and killed
- Born: Lim Hwee Huang; 1965; Singapore
- Died: 2 November 1984 (aged 19); Kallang Bahru, Singapore
- Cause of death: Murdered
- Other names: Michelle Lim; Lim Kwee Huang
- Occupation: Interior designer
- Known for: Murder victim

On 2 November 1984, 19-year-old interior designer Lim Hwee Huang (Chinese: 林桂芳; Pe̍h-ūe-jī: Lîm Kùi-huang) (Note: Her Chinese name was also spelt as 林慧芳 (Lîm Hŭi-huang) or 林桂芬(Lîm Kùi-hung)) was thrown off a tenth storey HDB flat at Kallang Bahru, after she was raped by 27-year-old Eurasian Singaporean Hensley Anthony Neville, who fled to the neighbouring country Malaysia. He was on the run for more than two years before he was finally arrested by Malaysian police, who sent him back to Singapore in March 1987 for the charge of murdering Lim. Neville, who was caught in the Malaysian state of Selangor, was also a suspect behind two unsolved killings in Malaysia.

Despite facing a capital murder charge and the death penalty, Neville refused to be assigned a lawyer in his case and elected to represent himself in court. He became the first person to stand trial for murder without a lawyer in Singapore. Six years after he first committed the crime, Neville was found guilty of the murder of Lim Hwee Huang, and he was sentenced to death by the High Court on 22 November 1990, and he was hanged on 28 August 1992 after he lost his appeal.

== Death of Lim Hwee Huang ==
On 2 November 1984, the police received a report that a young woman had fallen to her death from one of the flats at Kallang Bahru. She was wearing only her underwear and a shirt at the time she died.

The victim was identified as 19-year-old interior designer Lim Hwee Huang. (Note: Her name was also spelt Lim Kwee Huang) Lim's death was initially classified by the police to be suicide. However, the forensic pathologist Chao Tzee Cheng, who performed an autopsy on the deceased, found bruises around her neck and injuries at the sexual organs of Lim, which proven that Lim did not commit suicide, and that she had been killed by a possible rapist by strangulation. The police thus re-classified the case as murder. They also found Lim's trousers, which she last wore before she was killed by her alleged rapist.

According to Lim's family (who resided at Hougang), they were saddened and shocked to hear about Lim's death, and they noted that Lim often would always be punctual when she go to work at Balestier (where her interior design company was located) and also would reach home on time, and they noticed something was wrong when she never came back or at least called as usual to inform them she was staying out (which she often would do whenever she stayed outside of home). At the time of her death, Lim, who was the youngest of three children and only daughter of the family, was survived by her parents and two older brothers.

== Suspect's arrest ==
The 1984 photo of Hensley Anthony Neville, the suspect behind Lim Hwee Huang's murder.

After they started the police investigations, the police determined that Lim was thrown off from one of the ten-storey flats nearby. The owner of the unit was identified as 27-year-old Hensley Anthony Neville, a Singaporean of Eurasian descent (a source claimed Neville was Malaysian-born). However, despite the police's summoning of Neville to cooperate with investigations, Neville was never found, and it was believed that Neville had left the country. Hence, the police placed Neville on the wanted list as a suspect of Lim's murder, and his photo was released publicly on newspapers to call for information from the members of the public regarding his whereabouts.

In February 1987, after some investigations, the Royal Malaysia Police, having received the Singaporean police's appeal, finally located the prime suspect Hensley Anthony Neville, whom they found hiding in the Malaysian state of Selangor and later, 30-year-old Neville was arrested by the Malaysian police at a bus stop at Klang. Neville was later extradited from Kuala Lumpur to Singapore by flight on 18 March 1987, and he was charged with murder for the death of Lim Hwee Huang, two years and four months after she died.

The Singapore Police Force also thanked the Malaysian authorities for helping to track down and arrest Neville, who was one of the twelve suspects extradited to Singapore with the Malaysian police's assistance between January and June 1987; among the list of suspects extradited also included Tan Cheow Bock, a Singaporean labourer later sentenced to death in September 1990 for the 1980 high-profile killing of a babysitter Chia Chun Fong.

It was later investigated and uncovered by the Malaysian authorities that Neville was also the prime suspect behind an unsolved double murder in Malaysia; in that particular case, Neville allegedly killed two people before burying them in cement on 5 April 1986 at a garden in Batu, Selangor. However, the Malaysian police did not make any formal charges against Neville for these two murders and went ahead with extraditing him to Singapore for the charge of killing Lim upon the request of the Singaporean authorities.

== Murder trial ==
=== Preliminary hearing and dismissal of lawyer ===
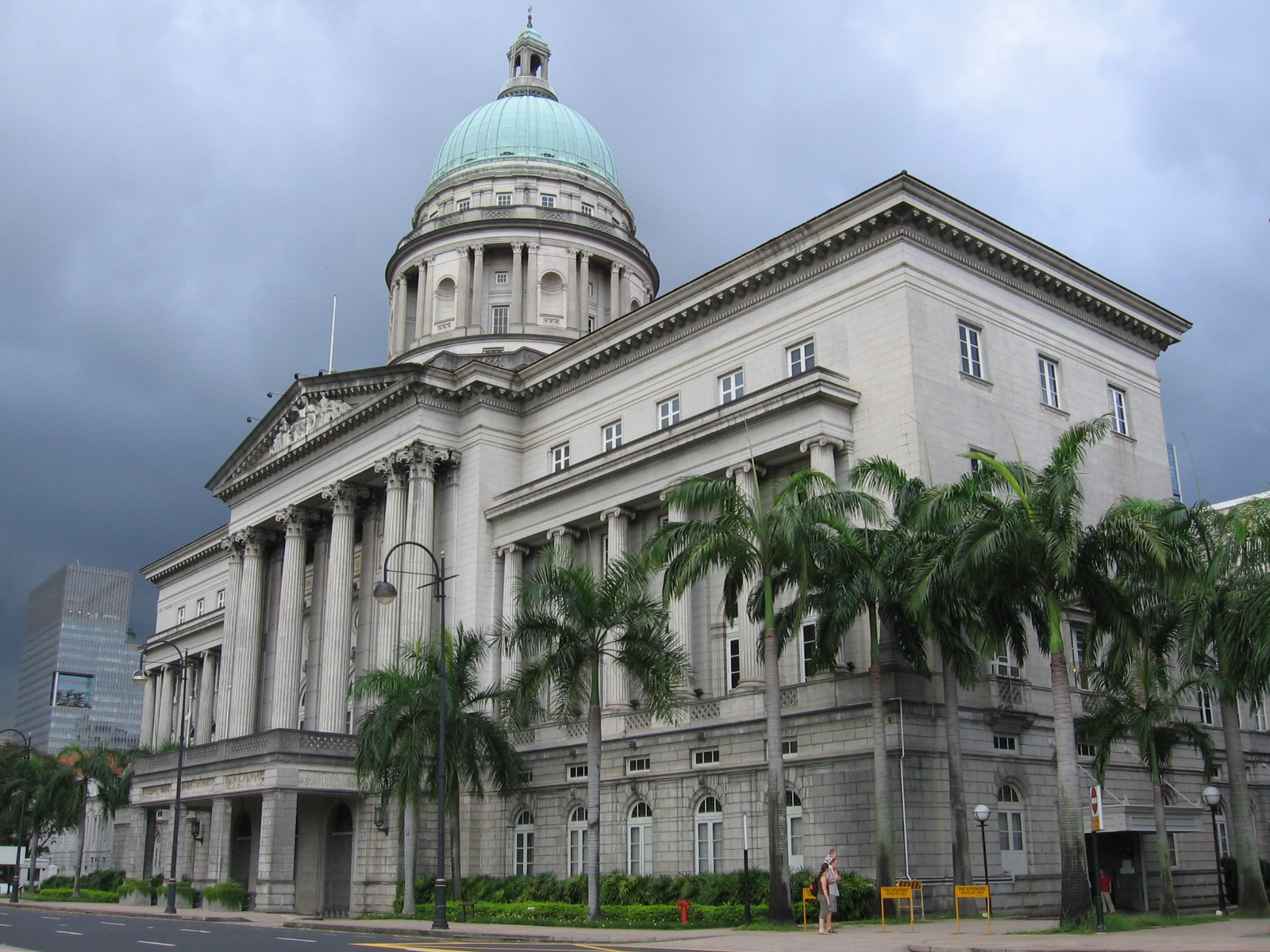
The trial of Neville was conducted at the High Court, formerly located at the old Supreme Court Building.

The case of Hensley Anthony Neville underwent several pre-trial conferences starting from August 1987 before the preliminary hearing concluded in November 1987 that Neville should stand trial for murder at the High Court.

Three years later, Neville's trial began on 12 November 1990. By this time, although he was assigned with a lawyer named G. Raman to argue his case, Neville refused to engage a lawyer and hence, chose to represent himself in the trial. Neville's case was the first where a defendant facing a murder charge elected to represent himself without a lawyer during his trial. The case was heard by High Court judge Lai Kew Chai and Judicial Commissioner (JC) Tan Teow Yeow, and the trial prosecutor was Lee Sing Lit.

=== Prosecution's first arguments ===
The prosecution's case, based on Neville's statements, alleged that Neville, who first met Lim in 1984 during a design course, had invited Lim to his flat at Kallang Bahru, where they had sex. According to Neville's confession, he had a quarrel with Lim afterwards, and he thus assaulted Lim and covered her mouth to suffocate her, before he threw her body out of the window. After Lim fell to her death, Neville frantically packed up his bag, passport and clothes to prepare to run off to Malaysia. Lim's 56-year-old father Lim Kok Kian (Chinese: 林国坚; pinyin: Lín Guójiān) and mother Tan Siok Kim (Chinese: 陈惜琴; pinyin: Chén Xīqín) (Note: Her name was also spelt as Tan Sioh Kin) both testified in court that Lim would often wear modest clothing and was never unruly, and instead, she was an obedient girl who was always filial to her parents.

=== New witness of case ===
During the trial however, a surprise witness, who was never presented at the 1987 preliminary hearing, turned up in court after an adjournment to testify that he had directly witnessed Neville murdering Lim on that night itself. Nizammuddean bin Rasul, a 22-year-old Malay Singaporean and cleaning supervisor, stated that six years ago, he was going out at night after leaving his friend's flat from nearby, and that was when he saw Neville holding a huge object looking like a pillow, and it later recognized it as the half-naked body of a woman, which Neville violently threw outside the flat window and leave the woman fall to her death. Nizammuddean stated that he was shocked to see Lim falling to her death. He stated that when he approached the girl's limp body, Lim, in her dying breath, suddenly grabbed Nizammuddean's hand and pleaded to the then 15-year-old boy to help her before she died on the spot. A passer-by told Nizammuddean to not be a busybody and brought him away from the scene, and Nizammuddean's mother also told him to not get involved after she learned of the murder he witnessed.

Nizammuddean told the court that for the next six years, he had been haunted by nightmares of Lim and her dying words, and in those dreams, he kept hearing Lim pleading to him to help her and testify against the killer, and his nightmares later disappeared after his consultations of a bomoh. However, they came back again during the few months before Neville's trial, and Nizammuddean finally decided to, out of conscience and remorse, tell the truth to the police, which allowed him to be summoned to court as a new witness. Nizammuddean also stated he hoped Lim would rest in peace after he testified against Neville in court, and proclaimed that Neville should be hanged for murdering Lim. According to Nizammuddean, these nightmares no longer surfaced ever since he came to court to testify.

=== Autopsy report ===
Professor Chao Tzee Cheng, the forensic pathologist who conducted a post-mortem examination of the victim, testified that Lim had been violently raped before her death rather than having consensual sex with Neville as he claimed, as there were severe bruises on Lim's hymen and vagina, and he also found no traces of love bites on Lim's neck. Professor Chao added that Lim's fall from the tenth storey had resulted in her heart and lungs being ruptured due to the fall's force impact, leading to her death. He also opined that base on Lim's small body size and weight of 43 kg, as well as the height from where she was thrown off as witnessed by Nizammuddean, the effects of the fall from such a height was sufficiently fatal to cause her to die upon impact.

=== Neville's defence ===
Although the prosecution argued that Neville had raped and suffocated Lim before throwing her off his kitchen window and packing his belongings to flee to Malaysia, Neville denied that he threw Lim to death or raped her. When he elected to go to the stand to give his defence, Neville stated that on the night of 1 November 1984, after Lim came to his flat, he had sex with her before he proceeded to read a book during the early hours of 2 November, and while he was not looking, Lim had apparently fallen out of her kitchen window and died from the fall, and his overall defence was that Lim had either fallen accidentally or committed suicide due to her sadness over an earlier argument she had with her parents on an earlier phone call. Even at the eleventh hour before sentencing, Neville again refused to engage a lawyer to help him in his closing submissions for the upcoming verdict.

== Verdict ==
1987 police mugshot of Neville

On 22 November 1990, a little more than six years after Lim Hwee Huang was raped and murdered, Neville's trial, which lasted a total of six days, finally came to an end and he was scheduled to be sentenced the same day after the last stage of closing submissions.

After a ten-minute adjournment of the trial session, Justice Lai Kew Chai, one of the two trial judges, read out the verdict in court, stating that there was sufficient evidence to prove that Neville had performed sexual intercourse with Lim against her will before he threw her out of his flat's kitchen window on purpose to ensure she fell to her death. He also admonished Neville for not only depriving a bright young woman like Lim of her virginity and dignity, but had also "wilfully and cruelly" deprived her of her right to live when he killed Lim. As such, both Justice Lai and the other trial judge Tan Teow Yeow found 33-year-old Hensley Anthony Neville guilty of murder, and sentenced him to death by hanging. Under the law, offenders convicted of murder within the Singapore jurisdiction would receive the death sentence, which was the mandatory punishment for murder.

According to Neville's sister (who was saddened at the verdict), she stated that she observed her brother had given up the will to live as he did not accept the offer of a defence counsel up till the end, and the judges had to guide Neville along on how to cross examine witnesses and make his submissions to allow some fairness for him in terms of making his defence. Neville also thanked the court for imposing a death sentence upon him.

In light of Neville's verdict of death, Lim's mother Tan Siok Kim stated that she was grateful to the police and court for having brought the "monster" (referring to Neville) who killed her daughter to justice, and she stated that she was also grateful to Nizammuddean, the Malay cleaner who witnessed her daughter's murder, for speaking up in court against Neville and hoped that he would not be tortured by nightmares anymore. Lim's mother said that Lim, who became an interior designer after completing secondary school, was always an obedient and filial daughter who never made her parents worry, and the news of her death hit her so hard that she had to take sleeping pills for three years following Lim's murder. Similarly, Lim's father Lim Kok Kian, who worked as a contractor, was also distraught to the point that he no longer could focus on his business, which he later passed on to his eldest son. Lim's second-eldest brother also said that his youngest sister was very cheerful and optimistic, which made them disbelieve the possibility of suicide when they heard of her death.

== Aftermath ==
While he was incarcerated on death row, Neville engaged a defence lawyer named Peter Fernando to represent him in his appeal against the sentence. Fernando argued in the appeal that although Neville had given conflicting accounts on what happened to the victim, Neville's account in court was the true version of events and he should be given the benefit of the doubt and found guilty of manslaughter rather than murder. On 12 November 1991, however, the three-judge Court of Appeal dismissed Neville's appeal, as they agreed with the trial judges that Neville had "wilfully and cruelly" killed Lim after he committed the rape.

On 28 August 1992, nine months after failing to overturn his death sentence by appeal, 35-year-old Hensley Anthony Neville was hanged at Changi Prison. Three months after Neville's execution, Singaporean crime show Crimewatch re-enacted the rape-murder of Lim Hwee Huang and aired it on television, and Neville's execution date was therefore revealed through the show. The episode also included a police appeal for information about the unsolved death of taxi driver Seing Koo Wan, who was later revealed to have been killed by a serial taxi robber Junalis Lumat, who was eventually caught and hanged for killing another taxi driver.

Another crime show True Files also aired an re-enactment of the Lim Hwee Huang murder case on 20 December 2004, as the ninth episode of the show's third season. However, the episode itself was unavailable for viewing online and it is currently archived among the records of National Archives Singapore.

For the next sixteen years, Neville remained as the only person who defended himself without a lawyer during a murder trial. It was only in 2007 when notorious gunman Tan Chor Jin, who shot and killed a nightclub owner named Lim Hock Soon, became the second person to represent himself without a lawyer during his trial for the fatal shooting. Similarly like Neville, Tan was also sentenced to death and eventually hanged on 9 January 2009. When Neville's former lawyer G Raman was interviewed in 2007 about the case in light of Tan's trial, the press reported that the person described Neville as weird for his behavior and lack of cooperativeness during his trial.
