= Lai Kew Chai =

Singaporean judge (1941–2006)

- 黎嘉才

Justice of Singapore
- In office 1 July 1981 – 6 February 2006
- Nominated by: Benjamin Henry Sheares

Chairman (Professional Affairs Committee) Singapore Academy of Law
- In office 24 July 1993 – 6 February 2006
- Succeeded by: V. K. Rajah

Chairman (Legal Education and Studies Committee) Singapore Academy of Law
- In office 19 January 1989 – 28 July 1995
- Succeeded by: Chan Sek Keong

Honorary Director, Postgraduate Practical Law Course (PLC) Board of Legal Education
- In office 1978–1981

Vice-President, Law Society of Singapore
- In office 1980–1981

Personal details
- Born: 7 February 1941 Tanjung Malim, Perak, Federated Malay States, British Malaya (now Malaysia)
- Died: 27 February 2006 (aged 65) Singapore
- Spouse: Dorothy
- Children: 2
- Education: National University of Singapore (NUS)

Lai Kew Chai (Chinese: 黎嘉才; pinyin: Lí Jiācái; 7 February 1941 – 27 February 2006) was a Singaporean judge and the longest-serving member of the Supreme Court Bench, having served for almost 25 years as a Judge.

== Biography ==
=== Early life and education ===
Born in Tanjung Malim, Perak, he received his early education at Methodist English School at his hometown in 1950, and at the Methodist Boys' School, Kuala Lumpur in 1955. Lai was an exceptional student in school, excelling as a school captain and in his studies. He received a School Book Prize for best HSC results for his final year examinations in 1961, and from there went on to read law at the University of Singapore in March 1962, with a University Entrance Scholarship. He continued to shine in his academic results, received a Book Prize for his first-year results in March 1963 and graduated with Honours in 1966.

=== Legal career ===
Upon graduation that year, he was admitted to the Singapore Bar on 14 December and began his career with the law firm Lee & Lee. In 1971 Lai become a full partner of the firm.

In his 13 years' private practice with the firm, he was very active member in the legal fraternity, having served as Honorary Director of the Postgraduate Practical Law Course and a member of the Military Court of Appeal between 1977 and 1981, and as vice-president of the Law Society of Singapore between 1980 and 1981.

On 1 July 1981, he was appointed to the High Court at the age of 40, making him the youngest judge to be appointed to the High Court in Singapore. In 1989, he was made Senate Member and executive committee member of the Singapore Academy of Law. Justice Lai was appointed Chairman of the Legal Education and Studies Committee of the academy from 19 January 1989 to 28 July 1995, and Chairman of the Professional Affairs Committee, Singapore Academy of Law from 24 July 1993 until his retirement on 6 February 2006. – on his 65th birthday.

== Select cases ==
In 1982, Lai issued the first written decision on the granting of a Mareva injunction in Singapore in the Art Trend Ltd v Blue Dolphin (Pte) Ltd case.

In October 1984, Lai presided the manslaughter trial of Beh Meng Chai, a Malaysian and one of the three perpetrators of the 1980 Jurong fishing port murders, in which a fisher dealer Lee Cheng Tiong and a teenager Teo Keng Siang were both robbed and killed. Beh was initially charged with murder after his capture in 1982, but after Beh made a plea bargain and expressed his willingness to be the prosecution witness in the trial of his accomplice Sim Min Teck, the prosecution proceeded with two reduced charges of manslaughter (also known as culpable homicide not amounting to murder) against Beh, who pleaded guilty. Lai sentenced Beh to life in prison and 24 strokes of the cane in October 1984, and he stated in his verdict that the brutality of the killings were so abhorrent that it justified the imposition of the maximum punishment for manslaughter in Beh's case, despite noting his young age and full cooperation with the police. As for Sim, he was sentenced to death and hanged for murder, but till today, the third and final accomplice Chng Meng Joo was never caught for the murders.

On 14 August 1985, Lai, together with High Court judge Abdul Wahab Ghows, heard the case of Sek Kim Wah, a Singaporean serial killer responsible for five murders between June and July 1983, consisting of the Seletar Reservoir double killings and the Andrew Road triple murders. During sentencing, Lai, who delivered the verdict, rejected Sek's defence of diminished responsibility (he claimed that he suffered from anti-social personality disorder and psychopathic personality disorder which diminished his responsibility of his crimes) and found him in full control of his faculties at the time of the killing. Sek was hanged on 9 December 1988 after the dismissal of his appeal against the conviction and sentence. Sek's Malaysian accomplice Nyu Kok Meng, who never harmed or killed a single victim, was charged under the Arms Offences Act in a separate trial for committing armed robbery with a rifle, and sentenced to life imprisonment and 6 strokes of the cane.

In 1986, Lai sentenced Malaysian businessman and the then-MCA President Tan Koon Swan to a S$500,000 fine and two years' imprisonment in Singapore, for Criminal Breach of Trust (CBT) which led to the collapse of Singaporean company Pan-Electric Industries. In his judgement, Lai said Tan's offences had "struck at the very heart, integrity, reputation and confidence of Singapore as a commercial city and financial centre". Tan's sentence was later reduced to 14 months, and he was released on 26 December 1987.

In April 1987, Lai and another judge Chan Sek Keong (then Judicial Commissioner) sentenced two Malaysians - Ramachandran Suppiah and Krishnan Varadan - to hang for the murder of Packiria Pillai Krishnasamy in 1984, after they found both men having acted in furtherance of the common intention to rob Packiria by stabbing the 74-year-old elderly man to death. Subsequently, after five years of appealing against the death sentence, Ramachandran was acquitted of the murder, while only Krishnan, who admitted to having stabbed the victim to death, was hanged on 15 April 1994.

Lai was also one of the two judges (the other being Joseph Grimberg) who sentenced Sim Ah Cheoh, a housewife and single mother of two sons, and her two bosses - Lim Joo Yin and Ronald Tan Chong Ngee - to death in 1988 for attempting to illegally import 1.37 kg of heroin from Singapore to the USA. Sim was later granted clemency and her sentence commuted to life imprisonment in 1992, while both Lim and Tan were executed.

In November 1990, Lai and another judge, Judicial commissioner (JC) Tan Teow Yeow, heard the case of Hensley Anthony Neville, a Singaporean fugitive caught in Malaysia in March 1987 for the 1984 rape and murder of Lim Hwee Huang, a 19-year-old interior designer who was thrown to her death from Neville's flat at Kallang Bahru. Neville was reportedly the first person to represent himself without a lawyer during a murder trial in Singapore. Although Neville argued that the sexual activity was consensual and that Lim could have either accidentally or suicidally fell to her death, both Lai and JC Tan rejected Neville's account and found that he had "wilfully and cruelly" killed Lim after he forcibly had sex with her, and hence sentenced him to death on 22 November 1990. Neville was eventually hanged on 28 August 1992.

In the case of Thahir v Pertamina (1992), the Indonesian petroleum conglomerate presented substantial claims to over S$60 million deposit in various accounts with Sumitomo Bank in Singapore, and belonging to the late General Achmad Thahir, a former General Assistant to Pertamina's President-Director, General Ibnu Sutowo. Much of the deposits were deemed to be kickbacks from corruption practices by the General Thahir, during his office in Pertamina between 14 October 1968 and the day of his death on 23 July 1976. Lai thus allowed Pertamina's claims to be passed and the decision was upheld by the Court of Appeal. The judgement passed by him deeply impressed The Privy Council in Britain, and formally accepted Lai's rejection of exercising an English legal authority on the Commonwealth corruption law that had been upheld for more than a century.

In March 1993, Lai also presided the trial of Yap Biew Hian, a Malaysian shipyard worker charged with killing one of the female tenants of his rented house at Katong there years before. Yap was said to have stabbed the 20-year-old victim Wong Mee Hiong in order to steal her valuables. Yap, who was 22 when he committed the crime, was found guilty and sentenced to hang for murdering Wong, after Lai deemed that two of the knife injuries inflicted by Yap were sufficient in the ordinary course of nature to cause death and the stabbing was done in furtherance of his intent to commit robbery.

Between March 1993 and December 1993, Lai presided over the three-week murder trial of Lim Lye Hock, who was charged with raping and murdering his 30-year-old childhood friend Tan Hui Ngin in October 1990. Out of the witnesses called, Lim's wife said that her husband had confessed to killing Tan by using a brick to bludgeon her on the head until she died. Overruling the defence's objection to call Lim's wife as a prosecution witness, Lai ruled that while marital communication between a wife and husband may be privileged and cannot be disclosed, a defendant's spouse had the right to come to court on its summon to testify against the defendant during a criminal proceeding, regardless of whether the evidence incriminates the spouse or not. In the end, Lim was found guilty of murder on 1 December 1993 and sentenced to death.

In January 1995, Lai also tried a Singaporean fugitive named S. S. Asokan for killing a loan shark. Asokan and another man named Maniam Rathinswamy had committed the crime by using an axe and knife to kill 32-year-old Tan Heng Hong at a hospital, before they moved Tan's body into his car and set it on fire at Mandai. While Maniam was arrested and sentenced to death in 1993, Asokan was arrested and detained for a robbery case in Malaysia before being sent back to Singapore for trial. Asokan was later found guilty and sentenced to death. On the morning of 8 September 1995, both Asokan and Maniam were hanged at Changi Prison.

On 24 June 1995, Lai found mechanic Nadasan Chandra Secharan guilty of murdering his lover Ramapiram Kannickaisparry and sentenced him to death. Ramapiram was stabbed thirteen times and ran over several times by a vehicle, which led to her sustaining rib and pelvis fractures, and a broken tooth belonging to her led to Nadasan being arrested and charged for the brutal murder. However, the Court of Appeal found that Nadasan was not involved in the murder and decided that he indeed had an alibi, leading to Nadasan being acquitted in January 1997.

On 12 May 2005, Singapore saw for the first time, a case involving exercise rights of discretion in the amendment of patent specifications for commercial products in the Trek Technology (Singapore) Pte Ltd v. FE Global Electronics PTE Ltd and others, and other suits [2005] (SGHC 90) Lai ruled on all counts, in favour of Trek 2000 International that their USB portable mass storage device patent to be valid, enforceable and infringed by Israel's M-Systems Flash Disk Pioneers Ltd, and Hong Kong's Ritronics Components.

Lai's last major case heard was that of the sexual assault cum murder of 8-year-old Chinese national Huang Na on 26 August 2005, by the accused Took Leng How. He ruled all forensic evidence pointed to Took's guilt and to his admission of sexual assault and murder of Huang Na, as well as dismissing Took's defence that he was schizophrenic. Took was hanged in Changi Prison on Friday, 3 November 2006 before dawn.

== Personal life and death ==
Lai Kew Chai was an active church worker and an avid traveller outside of his legal and judicial career, for he was a devoted Protestant Christian belonging to the Anglican church. In his lifetime, he was made Honorary Secretary to the Parochial Church Council of St. John's – St. Margaret's Church from 1973 to 1978, and a member of the Council between 1978 and 1981. He was also a Registrar of the Diocese of Singapore, appointed by The Bishop of Singapore.

Lai was married to Dorothy and had two children, both of whom became lawyers, as well as two granddaughters.

Lai died on 27 February 2006, after a seven-month battle against stomach cancer.
