= Singapore Heart Foundation =

- Abbreviation: SHF
- Formation: 14 January 1970; 56 years ago
- Type: Society
- Registration no.: S70SS0007H
- Legal status: Charity, Institution of a Public Character (IPC)
- Headquarters: 510 Thomson Road, #09-00 SLF Building, Singapore 298135
- Location: Singapore
- Region served: Singapore
- Chairman: Tan Huay Cheem
- CEO: Geoffrey Ong
- Website: myheart.org.sg

The Singapore Heart Foundation (SHF), formerly known as the Singapore National Heart Association (SNHA), is a registered Charity and Institution of a Public Character (IPC) in Singapore. It aims to promote heart health, prevent and reduce disability and death due to cardiovascular diseases and stroke.

SHF is a member of the World Heart Federation and has worked together on initiatives with the Singapore Civil Defence Force (SCDF), Asia Pacific Heart Rhythm Society, Singapore Cardiac Society and others.

== Programmes ==
SHF provides the following services and programmes:

- CPR+AED Certification Courses
- CPR Self-Learning Kiosks
- AED Registration
- Good Samaritan Initiative
- Cardiac Rehabilitation and Heart Wellness
- Save-A-Life Initiative
- School Programmes
- Community Education

== Cardiac Rehabilitation and Heart Wellness Programme ==
Singapore Heart Foundation's Heart Wellness Programme is the only structured community-based cardiac rehabilitation programme in Singapore. It is for patients who have completed their inpatient and outpatient cardiac rehab in the hospitals, as well as individuals at risk of heart disease. There are three centres located across Singapore, namely at Junction 8, Fortune Centre and Bukit Gombak Sports Centre. It is a multidisciplinary programme involving physiotherapists and dietitians, assisting patients with their lifelong maintenance of dietary habits, physical activity levels, and risk factor modification such as smoking cessation. Fees are highly subsidised by public donations and corporate sponsorships to keep them affordable for patients.

== National Heart Week/World Heart Day ==
World Heart Day is a global campaign celebrated annually on 29 September to increase public awareness and promote preventive measures to reduce the global incidence of cardiovascular disease (heart disease and stroke). In Singapore, World Heart Day is celebrated concurrently with National Heart Week organised by the Singapore Heart Foundation. Health screenings, fitness sessions, exhibitions, and other heart health activities are held in the heartlands to support the public in kickstarting a heart-healthier lifestyle.

In view of COVID-19, the signature event was held entirely online in 2020 and 2021, with digital health talks, workouts and cooking demos focused on the impact of sodium on high blood pressure.

SHF also created Hugopoly, a single-player interactive online game featuring SHF's lovable mascot, Hugo, to connect and motivate the public to deepen their heart health knowledge. Players were quizzed on CVD prevention and resuscitation techniques and put to weekly offline challenges to earn points for prize redemption. SHF received the “Most Inspiring World Heart Day Campaign” Award in recognition of our public outreach approach through Hugopoly, an interactive online single-player game we developed for the National Heart Week/World Heart Day 2021 (NHW/WHD).

With the relaxation of COVID-19 measures in 2022, Singapore Heart Foundation resumed a two-day roadshow held at Our Tampines Hub to raise awareness of high blood cholesterol.

== Project Heart ==
Project Heart is an annual lifesaving event by SHF. The event typically offers mass CPR+AED training to the public to provide them with confidence and skills required to perform cardiopulmonary resuscitation (CPR) and use the automated external defibrillator (AED) in a cardiac emergency.

In 2019, the event set the record for Largest Mass CPR+AED Certification Workshop in the Singapore Book of Records in 2019. That was the first time that a certification course was conducted using a Brayden manikin which provided testers with quantitative data of trainees’ performance according to the Singapore Resuscitation and First Aid Council (SRFAC) guidelines such as compression depth, compression rate and hand position. The manikins were connected by Bluetooth to electronic notepads which reflected scores of how well they were carried out. 662 out of 668 participants were certified, with a number accepted only after repeated attempts.

== Female Manikin Vest ==
According to findings from the 2020 “Knowledge, Attitude and Practice survey on CPR+AED” commissioned by the SHF and Singapore Civil Defence Force, 6% of respondents quoted “fear of being accused of molestation” as a deterrent to performing CPR on a stranger. Such fear may create a gender gap in life-saving that is unfavourable for cardiac arrest casualties. Their chances of survival drop by 10% for every minute they do not receive CPR.

SHF developed the female CPR manikin vest to help community first-responders get accustomed to doing chest compressions around the female breasts and pasting the AED pads with minimal chest exposure. It is the first-of-its-kind in Singapore and used in CPR+AED courses at the SHF for participants to get hands-on practice on performing CPR+AED skills for female casualties.

== See also ==
- List of voluntary welfare organisations in Singapore
