= Committee =

Body of one or more persons that is subordinate to a deliberative assembly

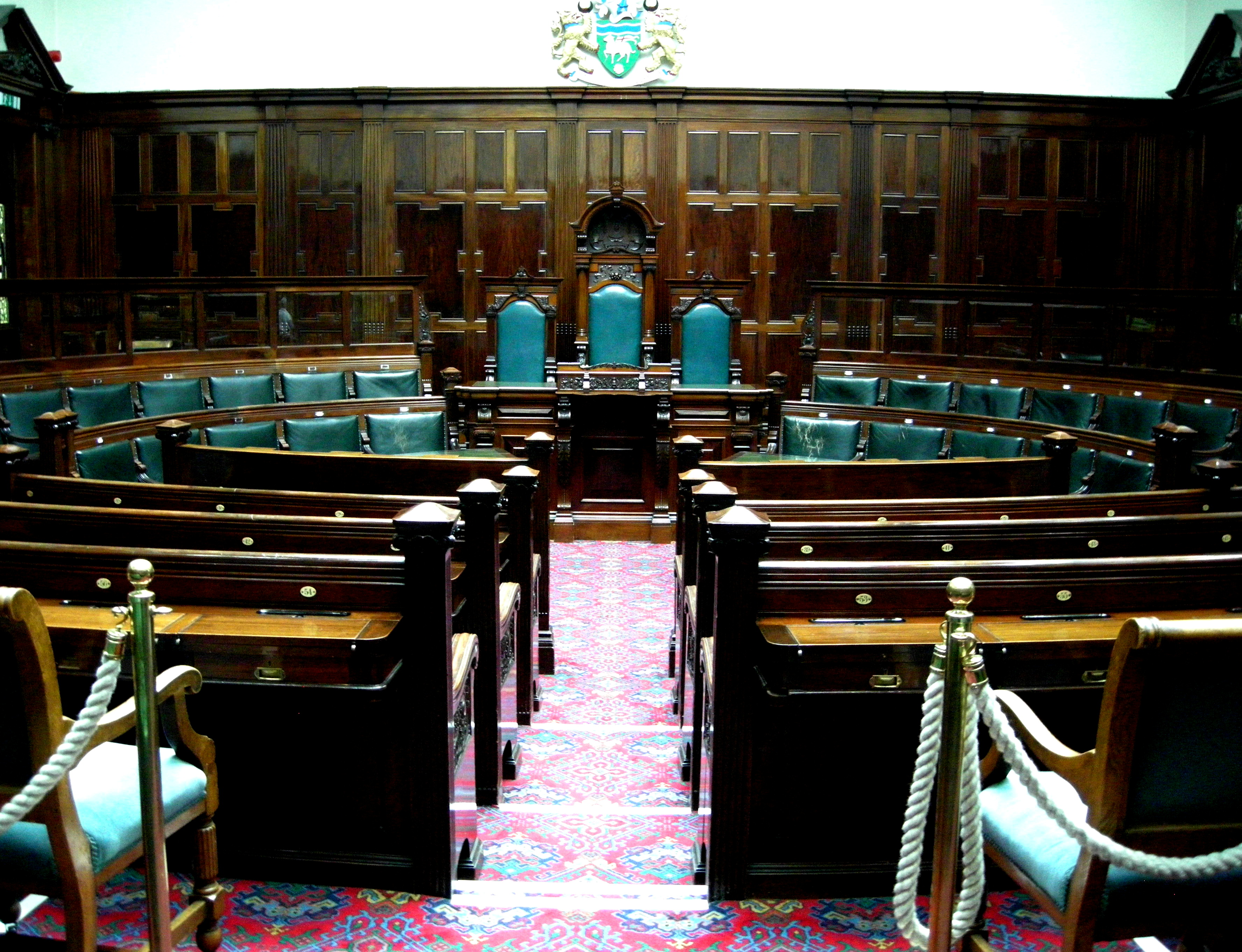
Committee room, designed in 1901, in Halifax Town Hall

A committee or commission is a body of one or more persons subordinate to a deliberative assembly or other form of organization. A committee may not itself be considered to be a form of assembly or a decision-making body. Usually, an assembly or organization sends matters to a committee as a way to explore them more fully than would be possible if the whole assembly or organization were considering them. Committees may have different functions and their types of work differ depending on the type of organization and its needs.

A member of a legislature may be delegated a committee assignment, which gives them the right to serve on a certain committee.

== Purpose ==
A deliberative assembly or other organization may form a committee (or "commission") consisting of one or more persons to assist with the work of the assembly. For larger organizations, much work is done in committees. They can be a way to formally draw together people of relevant expertise from different parts of an organization who otherwise would not have a good way to share information and coordinate actions. They may have the advantage of widening viewpoints and sharing out responsibilities. They can also be appointed with experts to recommend actions in matters that require specialized knowledge or technical judgment.

=== Functions ===
Committees can serve several different functions:

Governance
In organizations considered too large for all the members to participate in decisions affecting the organization as a whole, a smaller body, such as a board of directors, is given the power to make decisions, spend money, or take actions. A governance committee is formed as a separate committee to review the performance of the board and board policy as well as nominate candidates for the board.
Coordination and administration
A large body may have smaller committees with more specialized functions. Examples are an audit committee, an elections committee, a finance committee, a fundraising committee, and a program committee. Large conventions or academic conferences are usually organized by a coordinating committee drawn from the membership of the organization.
Research and recommendations
Committees may be formed to do research and make recommendations on a potential or planned project or change. For example, an organization considering a major capital investment might create a temporary working committee of several people to review options and make recommendations to upper management or the board of directors.
Discipline
A committee on discipline may be used to handle disciplinary procedures for members of the organization.

As a tactic for indecision
As a means of public relations by sending sensitive, inconvenient, or irrelevant matters to committees, organizations may bypass, stall, or disacknowledge matters without declaring a formal policy of inaction or indifference. However, this could be considered a dilatory tactic.

=== Power and authority ===
Generally, committees are required to report to their parent body. They do not usually have the power to act independently unless the body that created it gives it such power. Electoral accountability can affect committee activity.

== Formal procedures ==
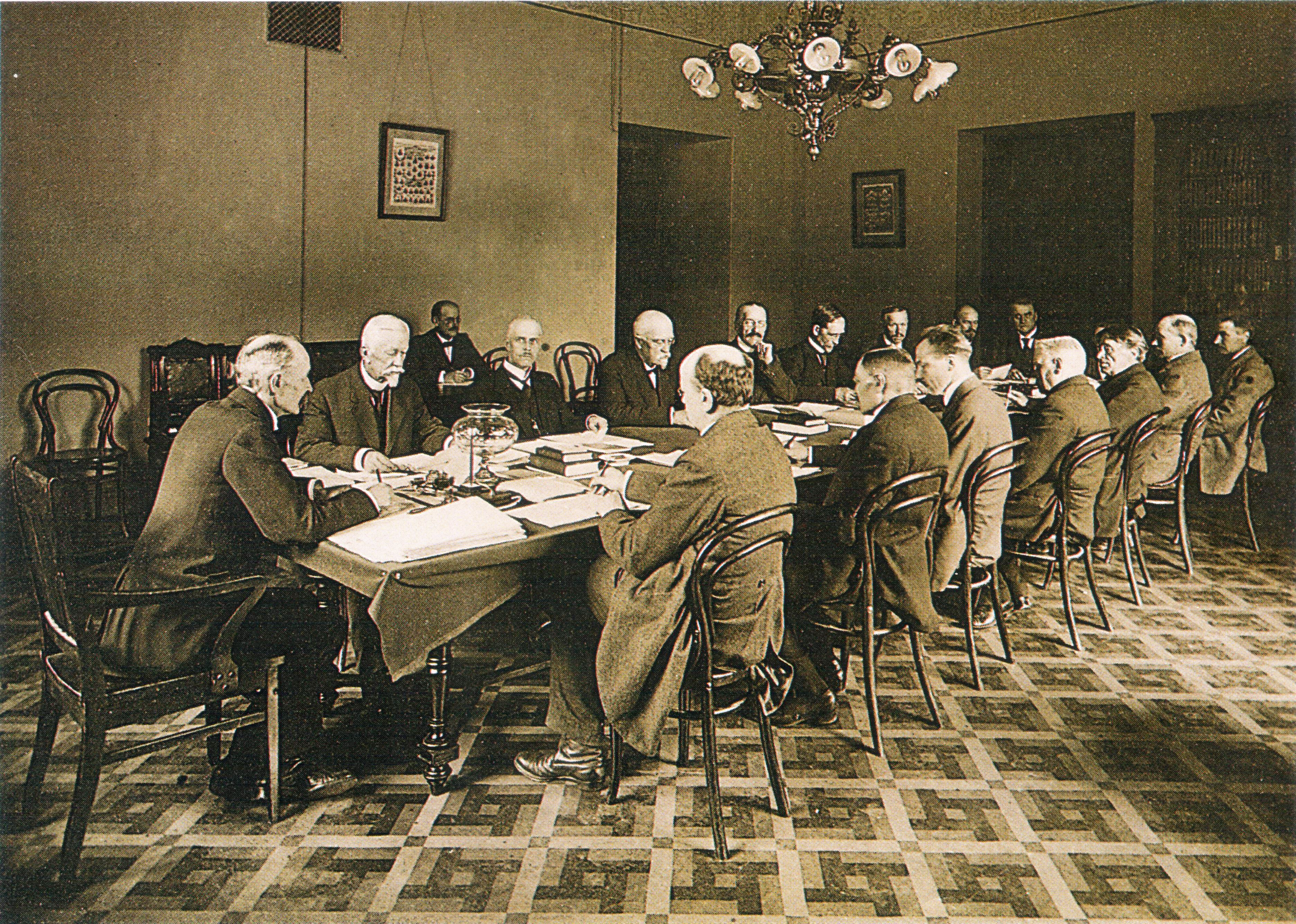
Meeting of the Constitutional Law Committee of the Finnish Parliament (Finnish: Perustuslakivaliokunta) at the House of the Estates in Helsinki, Finland in 1918. The chairman of the committee, K. J. Ståhlberg, at the left end of the table with his back to the camera.

When a committee is formed in a formal situation, such as committees in legislatures or for corporate bodies with by-laws, a chairman (or "chair" or "chairperson") is designated for the committee. Sometimes a vice-chairman (or similar name) is also appointed. It is common for the committee chairman to organize its meetings. Sometimes these meetings are held through videoconferencing or other means if committee members are not able to attend in person, as may be the case if they are in different parts of the country or the world.

The chairman is responsible for running meetings. Duties include keeping the discussion on the appropriate subject, recognizing members to speak, and confirming what the committee has decided (through voting or by unanimous consent). Using Robert's Rules of Order Newly Revised (RONR), committees may follow informal procedures (such as not requiring motions if it is clear what is being discussed). The level of formality depends on the size and type of committee, in which sometimes larger committees considering crucial issues may require more formal processes.

Minutes are a record of the decisions at meetings. They can be taken by a person designated as the secretary. For most organizations, committees are not required to keep formal minutes. However, some bodies require that committees take minutes, especially if the committees are public ones subject to open meeting laws.

Committees may meet on a regular basis, such as weekly or more often, or meetings may be called irregularly as the need arises. The frequency of the meetings depends on the work of the committee and the needs of the parent body.

When the committee completes its work, it provides the results in a report to its parent body. The report may include the methods used, the facts uncovered, the conclusions reached, and any recommendations. If the committee is not ready to report, it may provide a partial report or the assembly may discharge the committee of the matter so that the assembly can handle it. Also, if members of the committee are not performing their duties, they may be removed or replaced by the appointing power. Whether the committee continues to exist after presenting its report depends on the type of committee. Generally, committees established by the bylaws or the organization's rules continue to exist, while committees formed for a particular purpose go out of existence after the final report.

=== Commit (motion) ===
Commit (RONR)
- Class: Subsidiary motion
- Requires second?: Yes
- Debatable?: Yes, although debate on the motion must be confined to its merits only, and cannot go into the main question except as necessary for debate of the immediately pending question.
- May be reconsidered?: Yes, if a committee has not begun consideration of the question. A negative vote on this motion can be reconsidered only until such time as progress in business or debate has made it essentially a new question.
- Amendable?: Yes
- Vote required: Majority

In parliamentary procedure, the motion to commit (or refer) is used to refer another motion—usually a main motion—to a committee.

A motion to commit should specify to which committee the matter is to be referred, and if the committee is a special committee appointed specifically for purposes of the referred motion, it should also specify the number of committee members and the method of their selection, unless that is specified in the bylaws.

Any proposed amendments to the main motion that are pending at the time the motion is referred to a committee go to the committee as well.

Once referred, but before the committee reports its recommendations back to the assembly, the referred motion may be removed from the committee's consideration by the motion to discharge a committee.

=== Recommit ===
In the United States House of Representatives, a motion to recommit can be made with or without instructions. If the motion is made without instructions, the bill or resolution is simply sent back to the committee. If the motion is made with instructions and the motion is agreed to, the chairman of the committee in question will immediately report the bill or resolution back to the whole House with the new language. In this sense, a motion to recommit with instructions is effectively an amendment.

=== Variations for full assembly consideration ===
In Robert's Rules of Order Newly Revised (RONR), the motion to commit has three variations which do not turn a question over to a smaller group, but simply permit the assembly's full meeting body to consider it with the greater freedom of debate that is allowed to committees. These forms are to go into a committee of the whole, to go into a quasi-committee of the whole, and to consider informally. Passing any of these motions removes the limitations on the number of times a member can speak. The Standard Code of Parliamentary Procedure has informal consideration, but does not have "committee of the whole" or "quasi committee of the whole".

=== Discharge a committee ===
Discharge a committee (RONR)
- Class: Motion that brings a question again before the assembly
- In order when another has the floor?: No
- Requires second?: Yes
- Debatable?: Yes; debate can go into question in the hands of the committee.
- May be reconsidered?: Negative vote only
- Amendable?: Yes

In Robert's Rules of Order Newly Revised, the motion to discharge a committee is used to take a matter out of a committee's hands before the committee has made a final report on it. A committee can use this motion to discharge a subcommittee.

The vote required is a majority vote, if the committee has failed to report at the prescribed time or if the assembly is considering a partial report of the committee. Otherwise, it requires a majority vote with previous notice; a two-thirds vote; or a majority of the entire membership.

Under The Standard Code of Parliamentary Procedure, the assembly that has referred a motion or a matter to a committee may, by a majority vote, withdraw it at any time from the committee, refer it to another committee, or decide the question itself.

== Types ==
=== Executive committee ===
Organizations with a large board of directors (such as international labor unions, large corporations with thousands of stockholders or national and international organizations) may have a smaller body of the board, called an executive committee, to handle its business. The executive committee may function more like a board than an actual committee. In any case, an executive committee can only be established through a specific provision in the charter or bylaws of the entity (i.e. a board cannot appoint an executive committee without authorization to do so). Members of the executive committee may be elected by the overall franchised membership or by the board, depending on the rules of the organization, and usually consist of the CEO and the Vice Presidents in charge of respective directorates within the organization. However formed, an executive committee only has such powers and authority that the governing documents of the organization give it. In some cases, it may be empowered to act on behalf of the board or organization, while in others, it may only be able to make recommendations.

=== Conference committee ===
Governments at the national level may have a conference committee. A conference committee in a bicameral legislature is responsible for creating a compromise version of a particular bill when each house has passed a different version.

A conference committee in the United States Congress is a temporary panel of negotiators from the House of Representatives and the Senate. Unless one chamber decides to accept the other's original bill, the compromise version must pass both chambers after leaving the conference committee. This committee is usually composed of the senior members of the standing committees that originally considered the legislation in each chamber.

Other countries that use conference committees include France, Germany, Japan, and Switzerland. In Canada, conference committees have been unused since 1947. In the European Union (EU) legislative process, a similar committee is called a 'Conciliation Committee', which carries out the Trilogue negotiations in case the Council does not agree with a text amended and adopted by the European Parliament at a second reading. Although the practice has fallen out of favour in other Australian Parliaments, the Parliament of South Australia still regularly appoints a "Conference of Managers" from each House to negotiate compromises on disputed bills in private.

==== Different use of term ====
In organizations, the term "conference committee" may have a different meaning. This meaning may be associated with the conferences, or conventions, that the organization puts together. These committees that are responsible for organizing such events may be called "conference committees".

=== Standing committee ===
A standing committee is a subunit of a political or deliberative body established in a permanent fashion to aid the parent assembly in accomplishing its duties, for example by meeting on a specific, permanent policy domain (e.g. defence, health, or trade and industry). A standing committee is granted its scope and powers over a particular area of business by the governing documents. Standing committees meet on a regular or irregular basis depending on their function, and retain any power or oversight originally given them until subsequent official actions of the governing body (through changes to law or by-laws) disbands the committee.

==== Legislatures ====
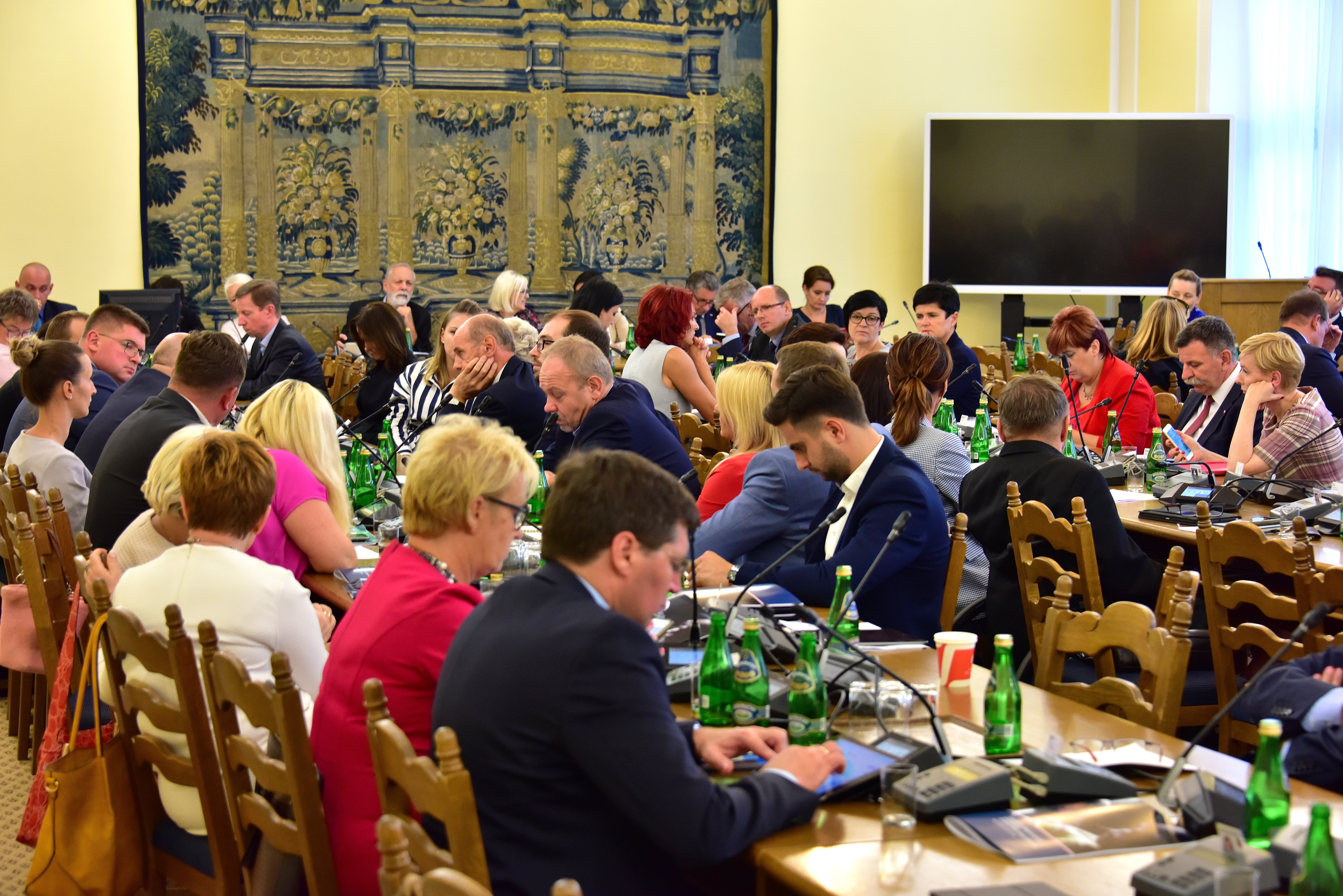
Joint meeting of two Sejm committees, the Social Policy and Family Committee, and the Education, Science and Youth Committee, in the Sejm complex in 2018

Most governmental legislative committees are standing committees. This phrase is used in the legislatures of the following countries:

- Armenia
  - Standing Committees of the National Assembly
- Australia
  - Australian House of Representatives committees
  - Australian Senate committees
- Canada
  - List of committees of the Canadian House of Commons
  - Standing committee (Canada)
- China
  - Standing Committee of the National People's Congress
  - Special committee of the National People's Congress
  - Politburo Standing Committee of the Chinese Communist Party
- Iceland
  - List of standing committees of the Icelandic parliament
- Ireland
  - Committees of the Oireachtas
- Hong Kong
  - Legislative Council (Hong Kong)
- India
  - Standing committee (India)
- Malaysia
  - Dewan Rakyat committees
  - Dewan Negara committees
- New Zealand
  - New Zealand House of Representatives committees
- Philippines
  - List of Philippine House of Representatives committees
- Thailand
  - Parliamentary committees of Thailand
- United Kingdom
  - Parliamentary committees of the United Kingdom
  - Public bill committee
- United States
  - Standing committee (United States Congress)

Under the laws of the United States of America, a standing committee is a Congressional committee permanently authorized by the United States House of Representatives and United States Senate rules. The Legislative Reorganization Act of 1946 greatly reduced the number of committees, and set up the legislative committee structure still in use today, as modified by authorized changes via the orderly mechanism of rule changes.

==== Examples in organizations ====
Examples of standing committees in organizations are; an audit committee, an elections committee, a finance committee, a fundraising committee, a governance committee, and a program committee. Typically, the standing committees perform their work throughout the year and present their reports at the annual meeting of the organization. These committees continue to exist after presenting their reports, although the membership in the committees may change.

=== Nominating committee ===
A nominating committee (or nominations committee) is a group formed for the purpose of nominating candidates for office or the board in an organization. It may consist of members from inside the organization. Sometimes a governance committee takes the role of a nominating committee. Depending on the organization, this committee may be empowered to actively seek out candidates or may only have the power to receive nominations from members and verify that the candidates are eligible.

A nominating committee works similarly to an electoral college, the main difference being that the available candidates, either nominated or "written in" outside of the committee's choices, are then voted into office by the membership. It is a part of governance methods often employed by corporate bodies, business entities, and social and sporting groups, especially clubs. The intention is that they be made up of qualified and knowledgeable people representing the best interests of the membership. In the case of business entities, their directors will often be brought in from outside, and receive a benefit for their expertise.

In the context of nominations for awards, a nominating committee can also be formed for the purpose of nominating persons or things held up for judgment by others as to their comparative quality or value, especially for the purpose of bestowing awards in the arts, or in application to industry's products and services. The objective being to update, set, and maintain high and possibly new standards.

=== Steering committee ===
A steering committee is a committee that provides guidance, direction and control to a project within an organization. The term is derived from the steering mechanism that changes the steering angle of a vehicle's wheels.

Project steering committees are frequently used for guiding and monitoring IT projects in large organizations, as part of project governance. The functions of the committee might include building a business case for the project, planning, providing assistance and guidance, monitoring the progress, controlling the project scope and resolving conflicts.

As with other committees, the specific duties and role of the steering committee vary among organizations.

==== Coalition committee ====
A coalition committee is a steering committee for a coalition government, an informal body composed of leading figures from the coalition parties and the government. Coalition committees, in contrast to parliamentary committees, have no formal rights.

=== Special committee ===
A special committee (also working, select, or ad hoc committee) is established to accomplish a particular task or to oversee a specific area in need of control or oversight. Many are research or coordination committees in type or purpose and are temporary. Some are a sub-group of a larger society with a particular area of interest which are organized to meet and discuss matters pertaining to their interests. For example; a group of astronomers might be organized to discuss how to get the larger society to address near Earth objects. A subgroup of engineers and scientists of a large project's development team could be organized to solve some particular issue with offsetting considerations and trade-offs. Once the committee makes its final report to its parent body, the special committee ceases to exist.

=== Subcommittee ===
A committee that is a subset of a larger committee is called a subcommittee. Committees that have a large workload may form subcommittees to further divide the work. Subcommittees report to the parent committee and not to the general assembly.

=== Committee of the whole ===
When the entire assembly meets as a committee to discuss or debate, this is called a "committee of the whole". This is a procedural device most commonly used by legislative bodies to discuss an issue under the rules of a committee meeting rather than the more formal and rigid rules which would have to be followed to actually enact legislation.

=== Central Committee ===
"Central Committee" is the common designation of the highest organ of communist parties between congresses. It is elected by the party congress, directs party activities, and elects the politburo and the general secretary.

== See also ==
- Caucus
- List of IEC technical committees
- List of the Czech Republic Senate committees
- Committee for the Promotion of Virtue and the Prevention of Vice (Saudi Arabia)
- Parliamentary committees of the United Kingdom
- Popular Committees (disambiguation)
- Revolutionary committee (disambiguation)
- Standing Committees of the European Parliament
- United States congressional committee
