= Murder of Ng Keng Hua =

1991 murder of a businessman in Singapore

Ng Keng Hua
- Ng Keng Hua, the businessman who was murdered during a robbery
- Born: Ng Keng Hua; 1959; Colony of Singapore
- Died: 27 February 1991 (aged 32); Geylang, Singapore
- Cause of death: Fatal stab wounds to heart and lung
- Other names: Ah Hua; Ji Shi Yu
- Education: Whampoa Secondary School (completed); Institute of Technical Education (dropped out)
- Occupation: Games stall operator
- Employer: Himself
- Known for: Murder victim

On 27 February 1991, inside his home at Geylang, 32-year-old businessman Ng Keng Hua (Chinese: 黄庆华; pinyin: Huáng Qìnghuá; Pe̍h-ōe-jī: N̂g Khèng-hôa) was stabbed twice by two attackers during a robbery bid, and he died as a result of the stabbing while warded at a hospital. One of the murderers, Tan Bee Hock (Chinese: 陈美福; pinyin: Chén Měifú; Pe̍h-ōe-jī: Tân Bí-hok), was found guilty of murdering Ng and sentenced to death in 1993. The other man, Toh Laie (Chinese: 杜来; pinyin: Dù Lái; Pe̍h-ōe-jī: Tō͘ Lâi), however, remains on the run since then, and he was never found.

== Murder ==
On the night of 27 February 1991, a 32-year-old businessman, identified as Ng Keng Hua, was murdered by two burglars at his three-storey house in Geylang.

According to first-hand witness accounts, Ng's 41-year-old business partner Cher Ah Tee (Chinese: 许亚弟; pinyin: Xǔ Yàdì; Pe̍h-ōe-jī: Khú A-tī), who was sleeping on the sofa of Ng's living room, was awakened by two men who threatened him on knifepoint and tied his hands, and covered his eyes. After stealing some cash in Malaysian currency (RM300 in total) and a S$1,100 Rolex watch from Cher, the burglars took him hostage and ordered him to bring them to Ng's bedroom, where Ng and his 25-year-old Malaysian fiancée Lee Ming Feong (Chinese: 李鸣凤; pinyin: Lǐ Míngfēng; Jyutping: Lei5 Ming4 Fung6) were staying in. Lee answered the door, and the burglars threatened her on knifepoint and claimed they want to steal from them, and forcibly brought Cher into the room. Ng, who was said to be naked in bed and pretended to be asleep right before the burglars entered, reportedly sprang out of bed to attempt to get away, but just as he reached the bedroom door, Ng got into a scuffle with one of the two burglars, who tried to stop him from escaping, and during that struggle, Ng was stabbed two times by the burglar.

During the stabbing, Ng's 33-year-old friend Teo Yee Teow (Chinese: 张贻标; pinyin: Zhāng Yíbiāo; Pe̍h-ōe-jī: Tiuⁿ Î-piau) came out of his room from next door and after witnessing the struggle between Ng and the robbers, he used a chair to smash one of the burglars on the head, and the man was injured as a result. Later, Teo and Ng, the latter whom was injured, gave chase after the two burglars, who all escaped the house without successfully stealing anything from Ng, and Teo stopped at the gate after Ng collapsed from his injuries. Ng was later taken to Tan Tock Seng Hospital, where he was pronounced dead an hour later at 8.30pm. At the time of his death, Ng was survived by his parents and seven siblings, and his father told the press that when both he and his wife reached the hospital, his son was still alive and conscious but was unable to speak, and he eventually died despite the doctors' best efforts to save his life.

According to his family and friends, Ng used to study marine education at the Institute of Technical Education after completing his secondary school education at Whampoa Secondary School, before he dropped out a year later to help at his father's chicken stall and would dabble in several small jobs before he became a games stall operator and made it big in his business. Ng was also described to be a filial son who treated his parents and family well, and had a long-term relationship with his fiancée, who originated from Ipoh. Many people who either lived or worked at Chinatown knew Ng as a generous, loyal and kind man who often help both acquaintances and strangers in need, and he also had 70 to 80 employees under his business, and shared a good relationship with all of them. This earned Ng the nickname "Ji Shi Yu" (及时雨 Jí Shíyǔ; meaning "Timely Rain" in Chinese).

The murder of Ng Keng Hua was the third robbery-murder case to happen during that month itself. One of the two first cases was the 12 February murder of Sukarti Amari, a 78-year-old housewife who was strangled by two robbers who took off with her jewelry and S$5,000 in cash. The two murderers, Mohamed Jaffar Abidin and Yacob Rusmatullah, were found guilty of murdering Sukarti, and they were hanged on 26 August 1994. The second was the 23 February murder of Jasmel Kaur, a 37-year-old nurse and mother of two who was smothered to death by an unknown intruder(s), who had stolen her jewelry with S$27,000. The case of Jasmel's murder remains unsolved as of today.

== Investigations and arrest ==
Toh Laie, who was on the wanted list for the robbery-murder of Ng Keng Hua

The police classified the death of Ng Keng Hua as murder, and investigations, led by Richard Lim Beng Gee, were conducted to arrest the two suspects, who were both seen escaping the house in opposite directions. The police were able to find bloodstains (which belonged to the injured suspect) at the area within Guillemard Road, and the police dogs were sent to sniff out the blood trail, which measured 400m and ended at a junction of Lorong 16. They also publicly appealed for witnesses who may have seen the suspects, as well as seeking the help of any taxi drivers who had possibly picked up the suspects or any doctors who may have treated the injured suspect. The police also recovered a knife belonging to one of the suspects from Ng's house, where the police discovered a sum of S$15,000 in Ng's wallet and another S$1,800 inside Ng's bedroom, and all these money were meant for Ng's upcoming gambling trip to Genting Highlands, left untouched inside the bedroom, which further supported the fact that the murderers failed to steal anything from Ng before murdering him.

During their investigations, the police were able to obtain a description of the suspects. One of them was said to be dark skinned while the other had a fairer complexion, and both appeared to be in their twenties at least, and their body build were generally not tall. Lee Ming Feong, Ng's fiancée, told them the face of one of the killers, and the police were able to piece together the facial description of the suspect.

Later, a member of the public provided a tip-off to the police regarding the injured suspect's whereabouts, and the police was able to arrest the man at a building in Thomson Road on 2 March 1991. The injured suspect, who was identified as 32-year-old Tan Bee Hock, was charged with murder on 4 March 1991.

With the arrest of Tan, the police was able to identify his accomplice, who was a 34-year-old Singaporean named Toh Laie (also spelt Toh Lai E), alias Ah Tat (Chinese: 阿达; pinyin: ā dá; Pe̍h-ōe-jī: A Ta̍t). However, Toh was not arrested for the murder, and the police therefore conducted a manhunt for Toh.

A third man, reportedly named Goh Lye Huat, was also arrested and charged with the murder of Ng. However, he was ultimately not put on trial like Tan.

On 17 September 1991, the police publicly appealed for the arrest of Toh Laie for the Ng Keng Hua murder case, as well as another man for a separate murder case, stating that all information provided would be kept confidential. The other man sought after in the appeal was 30-year-old Lim Ah Cheng (alias Simon or Toh Huay), who was allegedly responsible for the double murder of two Malaysian cousins, Kok Hon Kay (19 years old) and Kok Yoon Thong (22 years old), at Queen Street on 18 August 1991. Lim remains at large for the double murder as of today.

== Trial of Tan Bee Hock ==
=== Prosecution's case ===
Tan Bee Hock, who was the only one of the perpetrators to stand trial for murdering Ng Keng Hua

On 15 March 1993, 34-year-old Tan Bee Hock alone stood trial at the High Court for one count of murdering Ng Keng Hua. During the court proceedings, the prosecution was led by Deputy Public Prosecutor (DPP) Chua Eng Hui and Tan was represented by defence lawyer Ronald Ng. The trial was presided over by Judicial Commissioner M P H Rubin of the High Court. At that point of time, Toh Laie remained missing and was not yet arrested for killing Ng.

The trial court was told that before the murder, Tan planned to rob Ng a few days before the murder, after he found out from an employee of Ng that he earned a lot from his games stall business, which amounted to roughly S$10,000 per a few nights, and he also seen Ng wearing a lot of gold items. Tan said he was at that time facing financial trouble, as he gambled during the Chinese New Year of 1991 and lost a lot of money, and he also lost his job, which made him deciding to rob Ng to pay off his debts. In preparation for the robbery, Tan recruited Toh, who was reportedly consuming heroin and wanted more to feed his drug addiction, and he bought two pairs of white gloves and women's stockings, the latter which he and Toh meant to wear on their faces to avoid identification.

According to the witnesses and Tan's own confession, Ng was supposed to go to Genting Highlands during that afternoon of 27 February 1991, but he decided to rest before going on that night itself, and thus Cher Ah Tee rested in the living room while the others, including Ng, went to their respective rooms. After that, the two robbers managed to get into the house after narrowly escaping the detection of nearby patrol cars. Upon entry, the duo threatened Cher and stole both his watch and cash, before they went into Ng's bedroom, where Ng and his fiancée Lee Ming Feong were watching television inside, and threatened Lee on knifepoint while stating they want to rob her fiancé. Ng, who pretended to be asleep, sprang from the bed and tried to escape, and the robbers tried to stop him. It was during that scuffle, Ng got stabbed twice on the chest and it therefore led to Ng's death. After the scuffle, both Toh and Tan fled the house without Ng's valuables but with Cher's money and watch, and they went their separate ways upon leaving the house, although Tan would be caught eventually while Toh himself managed to evade the police and remained on the run since then. Both Lee and Teo Yee Teow were able to identify Tan as one of the murderers during a police identification parade.

A friend of Tan appeared in court to testify against Tan. According to the friend, Tan was hospitalized for his injuries and he contacted that same friend to help him change a sum of RM300 into Singaporean currency (SGD), as well as passing him a watch and three gold rings for safekeeping. These rings and watch and cash were recovered by the police, and were confirmed to be stolen from Ng's house; the friend was not aware of Tan's involvement in the murder. A doctor also testified in court that he treated Tan, who hailed a taxi and fainted inside while on the way seeking medical attention. He found bruises on both Tan's chest and neck, as well as fractures to Tan's fingers, and he stated it was more likely to be caused by a metal stool, although Tan gave him the story that he got these injuries after he fell down and hit a machine.

Dr Wee Keng Poh, a forensic pathologist who conducted an autopsy on Ng's corpse, testified that Ng had sustained two stab wounds on his chest, and both of these injuries were sufficient in the ordinary course of nature to cause death, as one of them had penetrated the heart and the other had pierced through the lower part of his right lung, and the wounds caused Ng to die from massive blood loss. Dr Wee additionally testified that the wounds were inflicted with deliberate great force and not done out of accident, and these wounds were caused by the same instrument, which Dr Wee believed to be a small-sized knife. It was the prosecution's case that Tan, who carried a small knife, was responsible for the fatal stabbing as he was seen having a scuffle with the deceased before his escape.

=== Defence's case and closing submissions ===
Originally, Tan said in his confession that he carried a smaller knife while Toh carried a larger knife, but he told the court that he lied about it and was actually carrying the longer knife, as he was afraid of getting a long sentence in prison for using a bigger knife during a robbery attempt. Tan even attempted to shift the blame to Toh, claiming that the person who stabbed Ng with the small knife was actually Toh, before he eventually gave in and admitted he stabbed Ng. Besides that, Tan elected to give his defence after the prosecution closed their case. Tan said that he never intended to murder Ng, and it was an accidental stabbing resulting in death. Tan stated that their plan was to rob and not kill, and he had promised his accomplice to not cause hurt at the insistence of Toh. Tan said that the plan backfired when Ng resisted and it caused Tan to stab Ng twice during the scuffle between Tan and Ng.

The defence argued for Tan to be found not guilty of murder, but of a lesser charge of robbery with hurt. Tan's counsel stated that Tan only armed himself with a knife to commit robbery and only meant to use it to threaten Ng, and he had no premeditation or plans to cause injury or death to Ng, and it was an accidental stabbing that unfortunately led to the death of Ng Keng Hua. However, the prosecution rebutted that while Tan truly had the intention to commit armed robbery, it was clear that when he intentionally caused hurt to Ng during the course of robbery, such that the two knife wounds inflicted by Tan was sufficient in the ordinary course of nature to cause death, and on these grounds, it was sufficient to prove that Tan had committed murder, and witnesses also verified it was Tan who used a small knife and stabbed Ng. The prosecution stated that from another perspective, even if it was the missing accomplice Toh Laie who had fatally stabbed Ng, the stabbing was done in furtherance of the common intention between Toh and Tan to rob Ng of his money, and by the legal definition of common intention, the court could still return with a verdict of murder in Tan's case.

== Tan's death sentence ==
On 22 March 1993, Judicial Commissioner M P H Rubin delivered his verdict. After full consideration of the facts, Judicial Commissioner Rubin found that Tan's defence of accidental stabbing ought to be rejected, since he has intentionally inflicted the two fatal stab wounds on Ng with a motive to rob the victim and therefore caused Ng's death, and on these grounds, he ruled that the prosecution had proven the charge of murder beyond a reasonable doubt and Tan should be convicted of murder.

As a result, 34-year-old Tan Bee Hock was found guilty of murder, and sentenced to death by hanging. Under Singaporean law, offenders would be handed the mandatory death penalty if they were found guilty of murder. Ng's family, including his parents, fiancée and younger siblings, were present in court at the time of sentencing, and Ng's 65-year-old father said that he lost a filial son like Ng, who was the second of eight children (which also include two more sons and five daughters), and described his son as a generous and kind person, and his loss was still greatly felt even after two years since his death.

During the same year he was sentenced to death, Tan's appeal was dismissed by the Court of Appeal's three-judge panel, which consisted of Chief Justice Yong Pung How and two Judges of Appeal L P Thean (Thean Lip Ping) and M Karthigesu, who all unanimously affirmed the trial judge's findings and hence upheld both Tan's death sentence and conviction for murder.

After the loss of his appeal, Tan had since been hanged in Changi Prison; the exact date of his execution was not made public.

== Current status of Toh Laie ==
In the aftermath, Tan Bee Hock's accomplice Toh Laie was not yet apprehended even after Tan was sentenced to hang.

In June 1993, Toh was classified as one of Singapore's ten most wanted criminals. Toh, together with nine other men, were wanted for various serious crimes like murder, kidnapping and firearm robbery. One of these nine other fugitives included Khor Kok Soon, an infamous gunman wanted in 1984 for the murder of a lorry driver and firearm robbery; Khor was arrested in 2003 after spending 19 years on the run, and he was convicted and hanged for shooting at a police officer.

In September 1996, it was updated that Toh remained as one of the top ten fugitives on Singapore's wanted list, although only nine of them (including Toh) was included in the list, as the tenth fugitive, Chua Kee Wah (alias Ah Keong), who was wanted for the 1992 double murders of 42-year-old female coffee shop owner Lim Tee Jong and 27-year-old prison warden Karamjit Singh, was killed during a gunfight with the Malaysian police at Kuala Lumpur in 1995. The tenth seat remained vacant as none of the other wanted suspects fit the criteria to be included. In November 1996, Singaporean crime show Crimewatch revealed the top ten fugitives on Singapore's wanted list, and Toh was one of them.

In January 1998, Toh's name once again appeared on the list of the top ten wanted criminals, and on the list itself, the person to remain on the list for the longest time was Chow Kok Heng, who masterminded the kidnapping of an Indonesian boy in 1977. All of Chow's five accomplices were already convicted for the crime: two of them were sentenced to life imprisonment in Singapore with caning while the remaining three, who were caught and tried in Indonesia, spent between three years and seven years in prison. A police spokesperson stated that Toh and the other eight suspects on the list were considered as "the most dangerous and desperate suspects", which was why they were being listed as the ten most sought-after fugitives for the respective offences they were charged for.

Till today, Toh Laie remains at large for the murder of Ng Keng Hua.

== See also ==
- Capital punishment in Singapore
- List of fugitives from justice who disappeared
