= Senate committee =

Senate committee may refer to:

- A committee of the Argentine Senate
- A committee of the Australian Senate
- A committee of the Canadian Senate
- A committee of the Czech Republic Senate
- A committee of the Kenyan Senate
- A committee of the Nigerian Senate
- A committee of the Philippine Senate
- A committee of the United States Senate

== See also ==
- Standing committee, a permanent committee that is sometimes also a Senate committee
