= Murder of Ong Huay Dee =

2000 case of a taxi driver murdered in Pasir Ris, Singapore

Ong Huay Dee
- Ong Huay Dee, the taxi driver who was killed
- Born: 1935; Singapore
- Died: 15 June 2000 (aged 64–65); Pasir Ris, Singapore
- Cause of death: Murder
- Occupation: Taxi driver
- Employer: NTUC Comfort
- Known for: Robbery and murder victim
- Spouse: Unnamed wife (died before 2000)
- Children: 6

On 15 June 2000, 65-year-old part-time taxi driver Ong Huay Dee (Chinese: 翁伙俤; pinyin: Wēng Huŏdì; Pe̍h-ōe-jī: Ong Hóe-tī) (Note: His Chinese name was also spelt as Chinese: 翁伙弟; pinyin: Wēng Huŏdì; Pe̍h-ōe-jī: Ong Hóe-tī (same pronunciation)) was murdered by a passenger while he was driving along Pasir Ris in Singapore. Ong's passenger and killer, 25-year-old Thai national Khwan-On Natthaphon, (Note: His name was also spelt as Khwan-On Nathaphon or Natthapong Khwan-on) was arrested and charged for the murder. Even though Khwan-On raised a defence of diminished responsibility and also stated he never intended to kill Ong, the trial court nonetheless rejected his defences and regarded him as a "cold-blooded murderer" for having intentionally caused the fatal head injuries on Ong. Hence, Khwan-On was found guilty of murdering Ong and sentenced to death in August 2001, and after losing his appeal, Khwan-On was hanged on 27 September 2002.

== Murder ==
On 15 June 2000 at 6am, a 45-year-old lorry driver named Ng Thiam Hock was driving along a forested area in Pasir Ris when he discovered a taxi abandoned in the middle of the road of that same area. Ng approached the taxi and made a shocking discovery of a taxi driver's dead body slumping down on the driver's steering wheel.

Ng contacted the police, and they arrived at the scene to investigate the gruesome discovery. The taxi driver was identified as 65-year-old Singaporean citizen Ong Huay Dee. Ong, who lived in Pasir Ris with his eldest son (aged 45 in 2000), was a retiree who began to work as a part-time taxi driver under NTUC Comfort (present-day ComfortDelGro) for more than a year before he was killed. Prior to his retirement in 1996, Ong spent more than 30 years working as a full-time taxi driver. At the time of his death, Ong, a widower, was survived by his two daughters, four sons and 14 grandchildren. His family were devastated to hear that Ong was murdered, especially since he just made plans to meet a relative on that day itself and to celebrate Father's Day with his children. This was the second time Ong became a victim of robbery, although during the first time, he was not injured and had handed over his valuables to the robber(s). Ong was described by his family and friends as a jovial and well-mannered man who liked his job as a taxi driver.

The police found that Ong sustained a gaping wound on his head, and according to the forensic pathologist Dr Teo Eng Swee (who performed the autopsy on the victim), the various injuries on Ong's head was caused by at least four blows inflicted with a blunt object like a hammer, and he said that the injuries were sufficient to cause death in the ordinary course of nature. He also stated the injuries were inflicted from behind, indicating that the taxi driver was likely attacked from behind and taken by surprise, since there were no signs of a struggle. His estimated time of death was at most six hours before he was discovered dead.

The case of Ong's murder was not the only killing of a taxi driver that took place in the year 2000 itself. Merely two months later, on 8 August 2000, 42-year-old taxi driver Koh Ngiap Yong was brutally murdered by three armed robbers at Chestnut Avenue of Bukit Batok. The three killers, who were arrested in October 2000 for murdering a moneychanger in another case, were subsequently linked to Koh's murder and executed on 25 October 2002 for killing both Koh and the moneychanger. Both the killings of Koh and Ong were among the high-profile cases of taxi drivers being murdered in the past few years.

As of the time when Ong was killed, the last robbery-murder case of a taxi driver occurred in January 1995, when 47-year-old taxi driver Lee Kok Yin was robbed and murdered by four Thai workers; only two of them were arrested, resulting in one sentenced to death for murder while another was sentenced to five years' jail with caning for attempted robbery.

== Police investigations ==
=== Arrest of suspect ===
Following the discovery of Ong's corpse, the case was classified as murder, and Gerald Lim was the head of the investigations. The motive of the crime was established to be robbery, since his mobile phone and wallet containing S$60 were missing, although Ong's gold chain and jade bangle were left untouched. They also speculated that there were two killers involved, since there were two pairs of footprints found at the crime scene, and the trail lasted for a distance of 100m.

The police retrieved phone records from the victim's handphone, and it was found that two calls were made from that phone after Ong was killed. One of them dialed '999' (the emergency police hotline) but the recorded phone call only recorded a male sound, while the second and final phone call was made to a phone number registered under the name of a truck driver. The driver was questioned by police and he stated he subscribed it under his name for a Thai migrant worker named "Montree", who worked at a Kaki Bukit construction site. Montree, who was questioned and heard the voice in the first call recording, recognized it as his friend Khwan-On Natthaphon's voice.

Following this information, 25-year-old Khwan-On was arrested at his workplace and the police found both Ong's missing wallet and handphone in his possession, and his arrest took place about 21 hours after the discovery of the killing. The murder weapon, alleged to be a hammer, was never found. About 300 people were questioned prior to Khwan-On's capture.

On 17 June 2000, Khwan-On was officially charged with murder in a district court. It was confirmed he was the sole perpetrator behind Ong's murder. The police's efforts of cracking the case within less than a day was commended by the public.

=== Background of suspect ===
Born in Thailand on 28 August 1974, Khwan-On Natthaphon was the youngest of seven children in his family. His father was a farmer and his mother, who did not work, had a mental illness, and one of his brothers was also mentally ill. Reportedly, Khwan-On was abused by his elder brother during his childhood. He also had a history of insomnia.

Khwan-On studied at a Thai medium school and completed his sixth year in secondary school. He did not enjoy his time in school. After leaving school at age 18, Khwan-On went to work as a factory hand and later a construction worker. Khwan-On later married a woman and had a son (born in 1998), but his wife left him for another man and his son also did not live with him.

Khwan-On first came to Singapore to work in 1998, but by illegal means. He was caught and sentenced to a jail term with caning for illegal entry into Singapore. Following his release, Khwan-On returned to Thailand and would step foot into Singapore a second time, and was employed as a carpenter in October 1999, a month after S R Nathan became the sixth President of Singapore.

== Trial of Khwan-On Natthaphon ==
=== Hearing ===
2000 police mugshot of Khwan-On after his arrest

On 29 January 2001, 26-year-old Khwan-On Natthaphon stood trial at the High Court for the murder of Ong Huay Dee in June 2000. He was represented by N K Rajah (Note: Also spelt as N K Rajarh.) and S Balamurugan, while the prosecution was led by Christina Koh and Kan Shuk Weng. The trial was presided by Justice M P H Rubin. Coincidentally, Justice Rubin was the same judge who sent three armed robbers to the gallows for murdering another taxi driver Koh Ngiap Yong, who died two months after Ong was killed.

According to Khwan-On's confession, he parted ways with a friend at Golden Mile Complex and hailed Ong's taxi at 11.30pm on 14 June 2000, hours before he killed Ong. Khwan-On said he originally asked Ong to drive him to Lorong Halus, but later changed the destination to another area in Pasir Ris (where Lorong Halus is also located). When reaching a forested area at Pasir Ris, Khwan-On took out his metal hammer and bludgeoned Ong on the head several times from behind, resulting in the death of 65-year-old Ong Huay Dee from these head injuries. Khwan-On also confessed that he took away Ong's mobile phone and stole his wallet, which contained S$60 in cash, but Khwan-On maintained that he never meant to kill Ong despite having caused the fatal injuries. It was revealed that before he confessed, Khwan-On initially denied the killing and also tried calling his girlfriend to testify he had an alibi to the authorities when the murder occurred.

Dr Douglas Kong Sim Guan, the defence's psychiatrist, testified on Khwan-On's behalf that he was suffering from major depressive disorder. Dr Kong stated that based on Khwan-On's account, he had been losing concentration in his work a month before the murder of Ong, and also suffered from constant headaches and insomnia, and turned to alcohol. Dr Kong therefore identified these possible symptoms as those of depression, and the condition was severe enough to cause Khwan-On to not have a full knowledge of what he was doing at the time of the killing, and had impaired his judgement and perception, and the injuries were inflicted by the defendant under a dazed and dissociative state, in addition to Khwan-On's suicidal attempt while in remand. These above explanations formed the basis for Khwan-On's defence of diminished responsibility.

In rebuttal, the prosecution called upon its psychiatric expert, Dr Tommy Tan, to testify against Khwan-On. Dr Tan said that the defendant did not suffer from any diminished responsibility, since he had a good work performance and got along well with his colleagues, and was able to coherently and clearly instruct the deceased victim to drive him to his destination. It was mentioned that Khwan-On's suicide attempt was an indication of a mild depressive response, which developed during his remand in prison for the charge of murdering Ong, but it also never meant he had depression at the time of the offence. The prosecution also argued that Khwan-On had intentionally inflicted the fatal injuries on Ong with the purpose of stealing his valuables from him and his actions made him nothing less than a cold blooded murderer who attempted to feign his illness to escape full responsibility for murder, and hence they sought a guilty verdict of murder in Khwan-On's case.

Closing submissions were made on 6 August 2001 and the verdict was scheduled to be given four days later.

=== Verdict ===
On 10 August 2001, after a trial lasting 22 days, Justice M P H Rubin delivered his verdict.

In his judgement, Justice Rubin found that Khwan-On did not suffer from diminished responsibility at the time of the killing. He also found that Khwan-On was in full control of his mental faculties when committing the crime, and he intentionally inflicted the fatal head injuries in furtherance of his intention to commit armed robbery, such that the injuries caused were in the ordinary course of nature to cause death, and that Khwan-On never done so in a dazed and dissociative state, and fully conscious of his actions. The judge also rejected Dr Kong's diagnosis and instead accepted Dr Tan's medical report, since the defence never provided evidence to substantiate Khwan-On's prior medical history and Dr Tan's evidence was more reliable and credible. Justice Rubin described Khwan-On's other defence of having no intent to commit murder as a "plainly unsustainable" defence, and hence, the judge concluded that the murder of Ong Huay Dee was carried out in a "cold-blooded manner", and it was not the result of a person acting under an abnormality of the mind.

As such, 26-year-old Khwan-On Natthaphon was found guilty of murder and sentenced to death. Under Section 302 of the Penal Code, the death penalty was prescribed as the mandatory punishment for murder upon conviction.

Ong's children were present at the courtroom to hear the sentence. One of Ong's sons and eldest daughter broke down during the hearing. Ong's 50-year-old eldest daughter Ong Choon Hwa stated that justice was served, but the outcome cannot bring her "healthy and jovial" father back and they still missed their father. Ong's children reportedly went to a Kong Meng San columbarium to pay respects to their father after the end of the trial. One of Ong's daughter-in-laws, a 45-year-old whose maiden surname was Yong, said that after they went to pay respects and brought the news of Khwan-On's death sentence to her late father-in-law, she hoped her late father-in-law would rest in peace, and stated that the killer should pay for what he did. Ong's 47-year-old eldest son Ong Khay Choong also stated he and the other family members were sympathetic towards Khwan-On's family since they would lose him to the gallows, and they knew the feeling of losing a loved one. He also said he hoped this would be a reminder for other foreigners who came to Singapore to work, reminding them to not resort to crimes like murder for easy money.

== Appeal ==
While he was held on death row at Changi Prison, Khwan-On Natthaphon filed an appeal against his sentence and conviction for murdering Ong Huay Dee.

On 19 November 2001, the Court of Appeal's three judges - Chief Justice Yong Pung How, and two Judges of Appeal L P Thean (Thean Lip Ping) and Chao Hick Tin - rejected Khwan-On's appeal, affirming the original trial judge's decision to dismiss his defence of diminished responsibility, and also upheld that his claims of not having the intent to cause death or any bodily injury resulting in death should not exonerate Khwan-On from his murder charge and death sentence.

After receiving word of Khwan-On's case, international human rights group Amnesty International made a public appeal to Singapore to spare Khwan-On's life and commute his death sentence to life imprisonment on the grounds that he had a mental disability at the time of the murder. The Thai government also made preparations to appeal to then President of Singapore S R Nathan for clemency. However, the death penalty in Khwan-On's case was not commuted despite the appeal.

== Execution ==
On 27 September 2002, 28-year-old Khwan-On Natthaphon was hanged in Changi Prison at dawn.

Six months before Khwan-On was put to death for the crime, the murder of Ong Huay Dee was re-enacted by Singaporean crime show Crimewatch and aired on television in March 2002.

As a result of the recent cases of violence (like robbery and murder) against taxi drivers, including the case of Ong and Koh Ngiap Yong, there were measures taken by the authorities to protect taxi drivers, including a distress alarm system that allow taxi drivers to alert the relevant authorities if their safety was threatened or they became victims of crime.

== See also ==
- Murder of Lee Kok Yin
- Murder of Koh Ngiap Yong
- Capital punishment in Singapore
