= Murder of Iordanka Apostolova =

1998 murder of foreign student in Singapore

Iordanka Apostolova
- Иорданка Апостолова
- Born: Iordanka Apostolova Apostolova; 26 August 1971; Bulgaria
- Died: 11 January 1998 (aged 25–26); Tanah Merah, Singapore
- Cause of death: Drowning due to exsanguination-induced loss of consciousness
- Resting place: Bulgaria
- Other names: Dani; Tamia Pachinko
- Education: A computer course in a Singaporean school
- Occupation: Student
- Known for: Murder victim

On 13 January 1998, a Bulgarian student named Iordanka Apostolova Apostolova (Note: In this Bulgarian name, the patronymic is Apostolova and the family name is Apostolova.) (Bulgarian: Иорданка Апостолова Апостолова), alias Tamia Pachinko (Тамиа Пачинко), was discovered dead in a canal at Tanah Merah Ferry Road, Singapore. Investigations led the police to arrest one male suspect, who was Iordanka's friend, while another man surrendered himself to the police. The two men were charged with her murder and later hanged in 1999. A third accomplice, the wife of one of the executed men who helped conceal the evidence of the murder, was subsequently imprisoned for six years by the courts for failing to report the crime to the authorities.

== Background ==
Not much is publicly known about Apostolova's early life. A newspaper article about her funeral says it took place "at the family home in Burgas, Bulgaria". The same article describes her father as "a former military man and now a co-owner of a computer firm in Burgas", and says her mother worked as "a computer operator at a petrol refinery". Apostolova arrived in Singapore in late 1996. She made friends with the members of the Singapore Amateur Boxing Association (SABA), and in July 1997, accompanied the team to Bogor, Indonesia, to watch them compete in the President's Cup. SABA secretary and national boxing team coach Syed Abdul Kadir later said:

She told me she was doing computer studies here. And she earned lots of money by exporting computer parts to her father in Bulgaria.

The shirt she was wearing when she died was given to her by the team while they were in Bogor.

== Discovery of victim and investigations ==
On 13 January 1998, 56-year-old You Ah Kam was fishing at the canal near Tanah Merah Ferry Road when he fished out the dead body of a young Caucasian woman, who had her legs tied to a heavy sack. The woman was also found wearing a shirt that had badges pinned to it, indicating she was a boxing fan. She was later identified as 26-year-old Iordanka Apostolova Apostolova (or simply, Iordanka Apostolova; alias Tamia Pachinko, nicknamed Dani), a Bulgarian student who came to Singapore to study in October 1996.

The police were contacted and forensic pathologist Chao Tzee Cheng was called to conduct an autopsy on Apostolova. Professor Chao ascertained that the victim had died a slow and painful death, as he found multiple incised wounds on the woman's neck, which were caused by a sharp object slicing her neck, and these wounds could cause slow bleeding that would result in death due to excessive loss of blood. Professor Chao found that the woman had drowned after being thrown into the canal, as Apostolova's lungs contained around 600 millilitres of water, meaning that she breathed in water while she was in the canal. Apostolova was, at most, unconscious at the time her body was disposed of.

The police, led by Richard Lim Beng Gee, investigated and found a receipt in the area near the canal. It was traced back to a petrol station where CCTV footage showed two Malay men purchasing the contents shown on the receipt. Apostolova's acquaintances told police that Apostolova was close friends with a Malay man, who was later identified as 22-year-old Shaiful Edham bin Adam. He was one of the two Malay men captured in the CCTV footage. The police found that Apostolova was trading commodities with Shaiful, and was a client of the firm where Shaiful worked as a trade director. Shaiful, then married to 23-year-old Hezlinda binte A. Rahman and a father to one newborn daughter, was called in for questioning on 15 January 1998. Shaiful later confessed to police that he killed Apostolova on 11 January 1998. Kevin Walter Hector, Shaiful's employer, who rented his Depot Road flat to Shaiful and his family, also found bloodstains in the flat which were later tested and matched the DNA of Apostolova.

Soon after his confession, Shaiful was charged with murder on 19 January 1998. Two days later, after confessing to his uncle and parents that he helped Shaiful dispose of Apostolova's body, 26-year-old Norishyam s/o Mohamed Ali (the other man in the CCTV footage), a friend of Shaiful from his two-year mandatory training at National Service (NS), surrendered himself to the police and told police about his role in the murder. Norishyam was then charged with murder on 22 January 1998. Shaiful and Norishyam would stand trial together for Apostolova's murder in late July 1998.

== Trial of Shaiful Edham Adam and Norishyam Mohamed Ali ==
=== The prosecution's case ===
Shaiful Edham bin Adam, the first accused, who allegedly planned to kill Apostolova.

On 29 July 1998, Shaiful Edham bin Adam and Norishyam s/o Mohamed Ali stood trial in the High Court of Singapore for the murder of Iordanka Apostolova. Lawyer Peter Fernando represented Norishyam while James Bahadur Masih was in charge of defending Shaiful.

The prosecution's case was based on the police statements given by Shaiful and Norishyam. In their statements, the men admitted that Apostolova died as a result of Shaiful cutting Apostolova's throat using a parang, and they had disposed of the body in the canal with Hezlinda's help, even buying items to ensure that the body remained underwater while using the rest to clean up the flat. The prosecution, led by Deputy Public Prosecutor (DPP) Francis Tseng, charged that the two men shared a common intention to kill Apostolova, since they acted together in ensuring her death and disposing of her body. It was also revealed that Shaiful had planned Apostolova's murder. He and Apostolova had planned to buy a Toyota car (which was owned by Shaiful's second employer, Eric Tan), and Apostolova, per their agreement, transferred around $40,000 from her bank account as down-payment. Concerned about incurring losses, Apostolova kept pestering Shaiful, which gradually annoyed Shaiful and he eventually wanted to kill her.

After Professor Chao Tzee Cheng took the stand and presented his autopsy findings, the defence counsel of the two men tried to argue that although the wounds were inflicted to kill Apostolova, the two men genuinely believed that Apostolova had died from the parang attack, and never knew she was alive when they disposed her body. As for the prosecution's arguments that Shaiful had planned the murder, Shaiful's colleague, Mohammed Noor bin Rahmat (alias Bobby), came to court as a witness and testified about a phone call between him and Shaiful, in which Shaiful tried to get him involved in the murder by offering him S$14,000. Mohammed Noor rejected Shaiful's offer, advising him not to do something stupid and feeling he was crazy. The phone call was made in the presence of Shaiful's employers, Erickson Pereira and Kevin Hector, and both Pereira and Hector confirmed the conversation between Hector and Shaiful. Shaiful's lawyer James Masih tried to raise doubts over Mohammed Noor's credibility by suggesting that Mohammed Noor owed Shaiful some money and gold. The defence alleged that given his annoyance at Shaiful's demands to return the cash, Mohammed Noor fabricated his story about the phone call.

Michael Gan, a car dealer, was another witness who had knowledge of Shaiful's plan to kill the Bulgarian student. He told the court that Shaiful asked him to look for a professional killer to help kill someone who showed interest in his wife; this conversation was confirmed by Koh Tee Hong and Koh Tee Yang, who knew Gan through the car purchase deal and heard about Shaiful's murder plot from Gan. Masih tried to paint Gan as a liar who lied about Shaiful's plan to murder Apostolova in order to get revenge at Shaiful for the failed deal to sell the car and loss of his commission for the car.

=== The defence's case ===
When Shaiful went up the stand to give his evidence, while he recounted the friendship he shared with Apostolova, he stated that on the day of Apostolova's murder, he and Apostolova argued about the disputes in the deal to sell the car. During the argument, Apostolova allegedly threatened to call her "foreign friends" (referring to the Mafia, presumably) to use force to settle the issues, and this escalated into vulgarities. Apostolova allegedly used a knife to fight Shaiful. Shaiful claimed that the knife wound he made on Apostolova's neck during their struggle was accidental, and he wanted to call for an ambulance, but Apostolova said she did not want to, as she did not want to get Shaiful into trouble. From Shaiful's account, Norishyam was already in Shaiful's flat, asShaiful had invited him for a drink and offered S$7,000 for Norishyam's wedding plans. After asking for a drink and lying down on the floor, Apostolova, still bleeding, asked to end her life so as not to die a painful death from her wound, which led to Shaiful enlisting Norishyam's help to kill Apostolova by telling Norishyam to cut Apostolova's neck, before disposing her in the canal.

Norishyam s/o Mohamed Ali, the second accused, whose defence was he only helped dispose the victim's body, not to kill Apostolova.

Norishyam however, gave a different account: he stated that he was offered S$7,000 to help Shaiful kill Apostolova. He stated that he had no wedding plans at the time, and Shaiful asked him to help kill Apostolova. He stated he came to the flat to try to dissuade Shaiful from committing murder, and did not want to accept the money. Upon entering the flat, he saw Apostolova already on the floor, bleeding from the wound while still alive, and he tried to leave, but Shaiful told him that he was already involved. Norishyam said that out of fear of Shaiful, he helped push a cushion on her face and held her legs down while Shaiful brought the parang down on Apostolova's neck. He stated that he did not kill Apostolova, and only helped Shaiful to dispose of the body with Hezlinda's help. Norishyam also demonstrated to the court how Shaiful used the parang to hack Apostolova's throat.

Hezlinda supported her husband's testimony and also placed the full blame of the crime on Norishyam; she was not yet charged for her role in the murder at this point. However, she admitted under DPP Tseng's questioning that she would lie to save her husband from the death penalty, which was a fatal mistake as it affected both her and Shaiful's credibility, which indirectly led to his death sentence.

=== Verdict ===
On 14 August 1998, High Court judge Kan Ting Chiu delivered his verdict. He found both Shaiful and Norishyam guilty of murder and sentenced both of them to death.

Reasoning first why he convicted Shaiful of murder, Justice Kan stated that there was evidence to back up the theory that Shaiful had offered money to Norishyam to help him kill Apostolova, and there was no regular contact maintained between the men since their days together while serving National Service. Shaiful's claim that the first slash wound was accidental was inconsistent with the pathologist's evidence that the injury to the front of the neck was caused by slicing; Norishyam also confirmed that Shaiful sliced Apostolova's neck by running the parang blade against her neck. He also stated that Shaiful clearly had the intent to cause Apostolova's death over their unsettled issues, and there was no reason for the witnesses, like Mohammed Noor, Michael Gan and others, to lie to frame Shaiful for the murder, since he had expressed his intentions and plot to kill Apostolova, and they were truthful in their testimony.

As for why Norishyam was guilty of murder, Justice Kan gave a longer explanation, telling Norishyam that he, as he admitted earlier, knew about Shaiful's plan to murder Apostolova prior to leaving his home to meet him at Depot Road. Justice Kan said that if Norishyam had genuinely intended to dissuade Shaiful from proceeding with his plan, he should have made a choice to leave the flat, which he in fact did, and was alone at the ground floor, before deciding to return to Shaiful's flat. After his return, not only did Norishyam never stop Shaiful from assaulting Apostolova, he even helped hold down Apostolova's legs and prevent her from making sounds while Shaiful used the parang on the victim. He even actively participated in cleaning the flat and helped the couple dispose of Apostolova's body in the canal in Tanah Merah Ferry Road. Since he acted in accordance with Shaiful's intention to cause Apostolova's death, Norishyam should be held responsible for committing Apostolova's murder.

He also stated that even though Apostolova's neck wounds were not immediately fatal, the men shared the common intention to cause her death and inflicted fatal neck wounds to kill her. Although the disposal of the victim's body in the water was responsible for a quickened death and was done under the mistaken belief that she had already died, it did not downplay the intention of the duo to murder Apostolova. The judge therefore ruled that the men should be convicted of murder, and imposed the mandatory death sentences.

== Trial of Hezlinda A. Rahman ==
On 21 September 1998, Hezlinda binte A. Rahman was arrested and charged in the district courts of Singapore with abetting her husband and Norishyam to dispose Apostolova's corpse, and for not reporting the murder to the police. Given that she was not involved in the plan to kill Apostolova and executing the murder, Hezlinda was not liable to a capital murder charge, unlike her husband and Norishyam. The couple's daughter was entrusted to the care of their relatives while they were undergoing court proceedings.

On 29 January 1999, Hezlinda was found guilty and sentenced to six years’ imprisonment. Senior district judge Richard Magnus, in sentencing Hezlinda, called her “wicked” and her conduct “reprehensible” as he referred to the cold-blooded nature of her crime and her active role as lookout while her husband killed Apostolova.

== Execution of the murderers ==
After being sentenced to death, both Shaiful and Norishyam appealed against their sentences. Both men reused their defences and arguments made in their trial to ask the Court of Appeal of Singapore to review their cases and convictions.

The judges - Chief Justice Yong Pung How, Judge of Appeal L P Thean and High Court judge Tan Lee Meng - found that the evidence against the two men was indicative of the common intention between them to commit the murder and there was no error in the trial judge's observations and ruling. Having cited past murder cases involving the concept of common intention, they decided to dismiss the appeals of Shaiful and Norishyam on 11 January 1999. In a remark regarding Norishyam's claim that he only helped dispose the body, CJ Yong commented, "If he (Norishyam) did not share a common intention, what was he there for? To do a charitable act?"

On 2 July 1999, despite Amnesty International's pleas for clemency, both 23-year-old Shaiful Edham bin Adam and 27-year-old Norishyam s/o Mohamed Ali were hanged in Singapore's Changi Prison, the only state prison where the country's death row inmates were held and executed by hanging. Before his execution, Shaiful reportedly wanted to divorce his wife, but his request was rejected. Norishyam's appeal for clemency was also rejected prior to his execution.

== Aftermath ==
Crime documentary series Crimewatch re-enacted the case in 1999. True Files also re-enacted the case, and the show's 11th episode, which featured the murder and trials of the murderers, first aired on 11 July 2002. The re-enactments were available on meWATCH. A third show, Whispers of the Dead, which featured the famous cases solved by late pathologist Chao Tzee Cheng, re-enacted the case and aired it as the 8th and final episode of the show's second and final season. The names of the victim and convicts were changed to protect their identities and for dramatic purposes.

In the True Files episode, the host of the show, Lim Kay Tong, together with the producers of the show, arrived at the Depot Road flat where Apostolova was murdered. The flat was vacant; the original owner, Kevin Hector, never returned to the flat since Apostolova died, according to neighbours. The flat was effectively considered abandoned, and was eventually repossessed by the Housing and Development Board due to arrears in monthly instalment mortgage payments. One of the trial witnesses, Mohamed Noor bin Rahmat, who was originally approached to help Shaiful murder Apostolova, was interviewed by the show's producers, albeit with his face concealed to protect his identity. Mohamed Noor stated that he declined to help Shaiful as he felt that he, as a human being, had no right to take another person's life no matter how bad their character, and he, out of conscience, was not enticed by Shaiful's monetary offer.

== See also ==
- Capital punishment in Singapore
- List of major crimes in Singapore
