= Popular Committees =

Popular Committees may refer to any of the following organizations:

- Popular Committees (Syria)
- Popular Committees (Yemen)
- Palestinian Popular Committees
- Popular Resistance Committees
- Popular Resistance Committees (Yemen)

== See also ==
- People's committee (disambiguation)
- Revolutionary committee (disambiguation)
