= Revolutionary Council =

Revolutionary Council may refer to the:

- Revolutionary Council (Afghanistan), organ of the People's Democratic Party of Afghanistan (PDPA) from 1965 until the party's collapse in 1992
- Revolutionary Council (African National Congress), a Tanzania-based organ of the National Executive Committee of the ANC, formed in 1969
- Revolutionary Council (Algeria), the body that ruled Algeria following its 1965 coup d'état
- Revolutionary Council (Portugal), a body created by the Armed Forces Movement in 1975, disbanded in 1982
- Revolutionary Council (Zanzibar), the cabinet of the semi-autonomous Revolutionary Government of Zanzibar

It may, alternatively, refer to the:

- Armed Forces Revolutionary Council, a group of Sierra Leone soldiers that allied itself with the rebel Revolutionary United Front in the late 1990s
- Council of Islamic Revolution (Iran), a group of clerics and experts chosen to manage Iran's 1979 Islamic revolution and then legislate for its interim government
- National Patriotic Front of Liberia – Central Revolutionary Council, a rebel group that participated in the Liberian civil war
- Revolutionary Council of Government (El Salvador), a body that ruled El Salvador from 1948 to 1950
- Revolutionary Military Council, the supreme military authority of Soviet Russia
- Supreme Revolutionary Council (Madagascar), the body that ruled Madagascar from 1975
- Supreme Revolutionary Council (Somalia), the body that ruled Somalia for most of the period between 1969 and 1991
- Union Revolutionary Council, the supreme governing body of socialist Burma between 1962 and 1974

== See also ==
- Revolutionary committee (disambiguation)
- Revolutionary Command Council (disambiguation)
- Workers' council
