= People's committee =

People's Committee may refer to

- People's Committee (postwar Korea)
- People's Committee to Protect Ukraine
- People's Committee of Siam
- People's Committee (Vietnam)

== See also ==
- Popular committees (disambiguation)
