= Murder of Koh Ngiap Yong =

2000 armed robbery and murder in Singapore

Koh Ngiap Yong
- Koh Ngiap Yong, the murdered taxi driver
- Born: Koh Ngiap Yong; 1958; Singapore
- Died: 8 August 2000 (aged 41–42); Chestnut Avenue, Singapore
- Cause of death: Murder
- Occupation: Taxi driver
- Known for: Robbery and murder victim
- Spouse: Unnamed wife
- Children: 3

On 8 August 2000 in Singapore, a group of three men, who were armed with firearms with an intent to commit robbery, had robbed and killed a taxi driver in midst of a planned crime spree. The victim was a 42-year-old taxi driver named Koh Ngiap Yong (Chinese: 许业荣; pinyin: Xǔ Yèróng; Pe̍h-ūe-jī: Khóu Ngia̍p-iông), whose taxi was taken by the trio as an escape vehicle for future robbery crimes and whom the three men killed by using a bayonet to stab him to death. In the aftermath of Koh's murder, the robbers had committed yet another robbery and also shot and killed their next victim, 39-year-old Jahabar Sathick, an Indian moneychanger.

It was only in October 2000 when the three men were finally caught and charged with the murders of Koh Ngiap Yong and the second victim, Jahabar Sathick. The three killers were eventually found guilty in September 2001 and sentenced to be executed by hanging in Changi Prison, resulting in their executions in October 2002.

== Crime and investigations ==
=== Murder of Koh Ngiap Yong ===
On 8 August 2000, the day before Singapore’s annual National Day, Koh Ngiap Yong, a taxi driver and father of three children, had just finished driving his daughter to school when he picked up three male Malay passengers, who hailed his TIBS taxi from an area around Bukit Batok. After boarding his taxi, the three men asked Koh to drive them to Chestnut Avenue.

After he drove to Chestnut Avenue and reached a quiet, deserted forest area, the three men suddenly wielded a bayonet and two guns, and threatened Koh, who fearfully tried to plead for his life and offer to pay anything to the robbers, and told them he had a family to feed. The robbers took out a pair of handcuffs and cuffed Koh’s wrists, before the taxi driver was led into the bushes, where one of them used the bayonet to stab Koh several times on the neck and chest, and after which, they took away Koh’s wallet and the handcuff and they left the taxi driver to die from his wounds beneath the vegetation as the trio drove off in Koh’s taxi. Koh Ngiap Yong was 42 years old when he died.

When Koh did not return that evening or the next day’s morning, Koh’s family lodged a missing person report with the police. Coincidentally, on the morning of 9 August 2000, at Chestnut Avenue, when three young boys were cycling to school along that same road, one of the students accidentally discovered Koh’s corpse in the forest. This prompted the police to rush to the scene after a report was made.

Koh’s murder was the second case of a taxi driver being murdered in Singapore during the year 2000. The first happened two months before in June 2000, when Ong Huay Dee was murdered by a Thai carpenter named Khwan-On Natthaphon during a robbery bid. Khwan-On was later found guilty and sentenced to death for the murder, and he was hanged on 27 September 2002.

=== First-stage investigations ===
Upon the report, Senior Station Inspector Zainal Abidin bin Ismail arrived at the scene with his group of officers, and a search was made in the nearby area. It resulted in a handcuff key being found nearby the location where the boy found Koh’s body; the robbers accidentally dropped it before they left Koh for dead the day before. The forensic pathologist, Dr Teo Eng Swee of the Health Sciences Authority, conducted an autopsy of the victim and found that the cause of Koh’s death was due to four of the bayonet wounds found on his chest, each of which he ascertained could cause Koh’s death even if the wounds were separate.

The lack of defensive injuries on Koh made Dr Teo believe that Koh was either immobilized or unconscious when he was killed by his assailant(s). The investigations on 10 August 2000 also led to the police to trace the last location of Koh Ngiap Yong’s taxi, which was found abandoned in a carpark in Bukit Batok. Other than that, there were no other clues for the police to further investigate Koh’s death and it remained unsolved.

=== Fatal shooting of Jahabar Sathick ===
Jahabar Sathick
- Born: Jahabar Sathick; 1961; India
- Died: 26 August 2000 (aged 38–39); Jalan Kukoh, Singapore
- Cause of death: Murder
- Other name: Jagabar Sathik
- Occupation: Moneychanger
- Known for: Robbery and murder victim
- Spouse: Janyam Begum
- Children: 3

18 days later, on 26 August 2000, the police received a report that a man was shot dead by two Malay men at an overhead bridge in Jalan Kukoh. In response, a police team, led by Assistant Superintendent of Police (ASP) Richard Lim Beng Gee, arrived at the scene where 39-year-old Indian-born moneychanger Jahabar Sathick (also spelt Jagabar Sathik) was murdered.

A witness told police that she saw Sathick being threatened by two men armed with a gun, and after he handed over his bag, Sathick was shot twice in the head and chest by one of the two men despite his pleas for mercy. At the time of his death, Sathick, then a Singapore Permanent Resident (PR), was married to 28-year-old Janyam Begum, with whom he had three children.

=== Investigations and breakthrough ===
A search in the nearby area yielded a spent cartridge, which was confirmed by experts to be coming from a pistol. After speaking to Sathick's widow and family, the police confirmed that whenever Sathick ended his work for the day and returned home daily, he often carried a bag that contained only his cellphone but no other valuables. The bag and phone were both missing, as they were being stolen by the two robbers after they shot Sathick to death.

The police investigations, which lasted until 15 October 2000, has allowed the investigators to trace the phone records of Sathick’s missing handphone, which they found to be still in use after 26 August 2000 when Sathick was killed. They found that there were three possible suspects from the frequency of the calls to whichever numbers the cellphone has dialled to. The three suspects were identified to be 33-year-old Wan Kamil bin Mohamed Shafian, 35-year-old Ibrahim bin Mohamed, and 30-year-old Rosli bin Ahmat.

After the identification of the three suspects, ASP Lim then led an operation to simultaneously arrest all three suspects. It was on 15 October 2000 that a team of Special Tactics and Rescue (Star) officers managed to apprehend Wan Kamil, Ibrahim and Rosli in three different locations in Singapore. A search at Wan Kamil’s home yielded two firearms - a Smith & Wesson revolver and a Colt semi-automatic pistol. The police also found eight pairs of handcuffs, but with only seven keys to the cuffs, in which the eighth key was missing.

From this, ASP Lim suspected that the trio might be involved in Koh Ngiap Yong’s murder at Chestnut Avenue, since there was coincidentally a similarly-shaped handcuff key being recovered from the place where Koh was murdered. After some probing, the three men admitted that they were involved in Koh’s murder. Ibrahim and Wan Kamil were both the two men seen at the crime scene robbing and killing Sathick.

Upon a tip-off by Wan Kamil’s friend, in which the friend informed the police that there was a locker in a Choa Chu Kang shopping mall that belonged to Wan Kamil. Inside, a bayonet was found in the locker. While no traces of blood were found on it at first, traces of Mr Koh's blood were later found in the handle by forensic experts after it was taken apart, thus linking the three men to Koh’s murder.

After this, all three men - Wan Kamil, Rosli and Ibrahim - were charged with the murders of Koh Ngiap Yong and Jahabar Sathick on 18 October 2000. If found guilty of murder under Singapore law, they would face the death penalty - the only available sentence then for murder.

== Murder trial ==
On 26 June 2001, Wan Kamil bin Mohamed Shafian, Rosli bin Ahmat and Ibrahim bin Mohamed stood trial in the High Court of Singapore for the murder of Koh Ngiap Yong; the three accused were set to be tried for Jahabar Sathick’s murder on a later date.

Wan Kamil was represented by lawyers Ahmad bin Khalis and Shah bin Bhavini; Rosli was assigned with two lawyers David Rasif and Sadari Musari to represent him; Ibrahim was defended by Luke Lee and Johan Ismail. Deputy Public Prosecutor Lawrence Ang and his two colleagues Toh Yung Cheong and April Phang from the Attorney-General’s Chambers were set to prosecute the three men for murder. The presiding judge was M P H Rubin, who later became Singapore’s High Commissioner to South Africa. One of Rosli's lawyers, David Rasif, would eventually become one of Singapore's most wanted fugitives within five years after Rosli's trial as he would swindle around $11.3 million and some gold from his clients (including an American couple) and escape from Singapore in 2006. Rasif remained on the run as of today.

Overall, the prosecution’s case was that the three men shared the common intention to commit armed robbery and the actions of one of them to stab Koh to death was in line with their common intention to rob. They also argued that the three men may not have the plan to kill Koh, but it became necessary to avoid any chances of being identified; they also carried weapons beforehand, suggesting that they knew that there would be violence expected in the course of the robbery. With reference to the trio’s plans to rob the goldsmiths and money changers and Cisco officers (revealed by the three during the investigations) prior to murdering Koh, the prosecution argued that there was premeditation to commit robbery and use violence if necessary on the part of the three men. As the charge of murder against the trio was third-degree in nature, which meant murder by intentionally inflicting injuries that were sufficient to cause a person's death, the prosecution sought to prove that the men were guilty since the wounds intentionally inflicted on Koh were sufficient to lead to his death, and that the rest should be assumed guilty even if only one of them was the one stabbing Koh since the stabbing was done in furtherance of their common intention to rob the taxi driver.

Still, the defence tried to argue otherwise on behalf of their three clients, who elected to give their defence on the stand. The following were the three men's accounts of what happened.

=== Wan Kamil’s account ===
Wan Kamil bin Mohamed Shafian

Wan Kamil bin Mohamed Shafian, born on 1 May 1967, was the first accused who went up the stand to give his evidence first. Wan Kamil recounted that before Koh Ngiap Yong’s murder, the three had planned to commit a series of armed robberies; he stated that for this purpose, he travelled to Thailand and went to the town of Songkhla to illegally purchase his two guns and the bayonet they used to kill Koh. Wan Kamil also said that there was an agreement to target moneychangers and goldsmiths as their victims to rob, and they reach a consensus to steal a vehicle to use as their getaway car to escape once they commit each robbery out of their planned crime spree.

Wan Kamil stated that on the day they hailed Koh’s taxi in Bukit Batok before killing him, he carried a Timberland bag which contained his pistol, revolver, handcuffs and bayonet, and he admitted he was the one who took out his Colt pistol to threaten Koh at gunpoint to get him out of the taxi. In his statements and on the stand, Wan Kamil pinpointed the third defendant Rosli bin Ahmat as the one who stabbed Koh to death. He stated that he only wanted to handcuff and tie the taxi driver to the tree in Chestnut Avenue before they drove off in the taxi, and would report to the police where Koh was.

Wan Kamil claimed he was all along, together with Ibrahim, inside the taxi while Rosli alone led Koh into the bushes. Wan Kamil stated that it was only then he heard Koh’s cries of pain and saw Rosli returning with the bayonet stained in Koh’s blood. Wan Kamil told the police and court that he was shocked to see Rosli having, at his own accord, used the bayonet to harm and kill Koh when it was not part of their plan and there were no orders from him or Ibrahim to prompt Rosli to harm or finish off the taxi driver. He said that due to his fear that the taxi driver has died, he did not report to the police about the stabbing.

The trio, he said, did not follow their initial plan to rob a Jurong West goldsmith shop and instead, drove to Woodlands and into the area where there were a lot of goldsmith shops, money changers and banks, intending to find a target but ultimately gave up due to the presence of CCTVs. Wan Kamil stated he had no intention of killing Koh and claimed he felt sorry for the death of the taxi driver.

=== Ibrahim’s account ===
Ibrahim bin Mohamed

Ibrahim bin Mohamed, born on 18 November 1965, became the second accused who took the stand after Wan Kamil. Like Wan Kamil, Ibrahim also pointed Rosli as the one who stabbed Koh to death and both he and Wan Kamil were inside the taxi at the time Koh was murdered. Ibrahim, in his defence, stated that he only acted as the driver, and had no partake in the murder.

Ibrahim said that he first knew Wan Kamil in July 2000 after his friend Rosli introduced him over a drinks session. At that time, Ibrahim lost his only source of income because he was unable to continue working as a coffee shop assistant due to the coffee shop’s closure for renovation purposes. After they met, the three decided to obtain money through robbing the goldsmiths and money changers. Ibrahim was placed in charge of becoming a driver of a get-away vehicle for their plan.

From Ibrahim’s side of the story, he left his Filipino girlfriend’s flat that morning to meet up with Wan Kamil and Rosli, and they observed their surroundings for any unattended vehicles before settling on hailing Koh’s taxi for the purpose of robbing it for use. Ibrahim said Wan Kamil had told him beforehand that he carried two guns for the robbery. He also said that at that time, there was no discussion on harming or killing the taxi driver.

Ibrahim said that when they reached Chestnut Avenue, he took over the wheel as Koh was forced out of the taxi by gunpoint and he observed Koh being taken into the forest by Rosli as Wan Kamil went behind the vehicle. Ibrahim stated while he did not witness what happened to Koh after he alighted the taxi, he was shocked to see Rosli carrying a bloodstained bayonet as he moved out of the bushes, where he left Koh’s dead body behind. Ibrahim said after they drove to Woodlands, they changed their clothes and cleaned up, and he observed that Rosli seemed quiet and worried as Wan Kamil tried to console him.

In his defence, Ibrahim mainly stated that all along, he was on the taxi and sitting at the driver’s seat and never partake in any action to stab Koh, and he never knew that Wan Kamil and Rosli brought along a bayonet (until Rosli used it to kill Koh) despite knowing that they have guns ready for their planned robberies on that fateful day itself. For this, his lawyers argued that Ibrahim was not blameworthy for the murder committed by Rosli since his role was limited to driver only and nothing else, and there was no common intention between him and Rosli to harm Koh (which they claimed was solely Rosli’s guilt) despite their common agreement to commit robbery.

=== Rosli’s account ===
Rosli bin Ahmat

Rosli bin Ahmat, born on 20 July 1970, was the third and final accused who conducted his defence last. In his account, Rosli did not deny that he was the one who used the bayonet to stab Koh to death. However, he pushed the blame on Wan Kamil, stating he did the killing under duress after Wan Kamil intimidated him and threatened him into compliance with his orders to finish off the taxi driver.

Rosli stated that Wan Kamil, whom he befriended in December 1999, had discussed with him and Ibrahim in early August 2000 to commit robbery, and he suggested robbing Cisco officers who were escorting cash that to be loaded to the POSB ATM machines near the entrance of West Mall in Bukit Batok. Wan Kamil told him that he used to be working as a Cisco officer and hence he was familiar with the timing when the officers would load the cash into ATM machines. They initially agreed to engage in a shootout with the officers and take the money, but due to the presence of too many people at the vicinity, the plan was aborted and hence he suggested stealing a vehicle as a getaway car, which led to the trio to eventually target Koh and his taxi.

Rosli stated that after they arrived at the deserted forest near Chestnut Avenue, as they led Koh out of the taxi, Wan Kamil aggressively ordered Rosli to finish off Koh as he handcuffed Koh, who pleaded for his life by telling Rosli that he had a family to feed. Wan Kamil was also the one, from Rosli’s terms, who pressured him to quickly finish his job, and reluctantly, Rosli covered Koh’s mouth and used the bayonet to stab Koh at least four to five times. He also took Koh's wallet, which contained $600, before leaving in the taxi with Ibrahim and Wan Kamil; he reportedly claimed he was plagued with thoughts about Koh's death and could not think of the robbery. Rosli also mentioned that a few weeks prior to Koh’s murder, Wan Kamil informed him that he had two guns, and showed them to him on two occasions at his flat, where Wan Kamil lived with his two children, wife and maid.

=== Verdict ===
On 5 September 2001, after hearing the case for 19 days, High Court judge M P H Rubin delivered his judgement, and ruled that all the three men should be sentenced to death for murder.

In his written grounds of decision, Justice Rubin found that there was sufficient evidence to prove the prosecution’s case against the three men. He found that Rosli had intentionally inflicted the wounds on Koh and there was no duress faced by Rosli; instead, he found Rosli to have committed the crime in cold blood in spite of Koh's desperate pleas for mercy on his life at the time he was killed. He stated that duress was not a legitimate defence against murder as ruled by law, given that such instances where offenders committed crimes under duress did not have the right to such a defence as long as the crime committed was murder. As the wounds intentionally inflicted upon Koh were sufficient to cause death in the ordinary course of nature, and since Rosli did not rebut the fact that he indeed stabbed Koh, Rosli was guilty of third-degree murder under the eyes of law.

For both Wan Kamil and Ibrahim, Justice Rubin determined that they shared the common intention together with Rosli to commit robbery; for this, even if they were totally not involved in the stabbing of Koh or never planned for it, it should be inferred that the stabbing by Rosli was done in furtherance of their joint common intention to rob Koh and since they were armed beforehand, it should be inferred that there was a premeditation to use the guns or bayonet to cause hurt or death in the course of robbery. This premeditation was also existent from their pre-planned robbery attempts on heavily-guarded places and goldsmiths.

When turning his attention to Ibrahim's role, he has no right to say he only acted as driver or never knew Koh would be killed based on his guilt of murder in lieu of the group's common intention, given that he would have noticed or seen the bayonet being wielded when Koh was forced out of his taxi, especially when it was within the close confines of the vehicle itself. For this reason, the judge found Ibrahim to be lying about his ignorance to the bayonet or possibility of harm. Wan Kamil's denials were, in the eyes of the judge, attempts to distance himself from what Rosli deliberately did since he was the mastermind behind the crime spree, and his decision to bring the weapons along showed he or the others had plans to use them, which reflected their common intention. His willful ignorance to the stabbing of Koh has also reflected his morally-lacking character and his lack of responsibility for his actions, which were principal to leading to the fatal outcome of the Chestnut Avenue taxi robbery.

As such, Justice Rubin concluded in his verdict that the three men should receive the rightful retribution they deserved for their greed-driven and cold-blooded actions, hence he imposed the death penalty on the three men after convicting them of the murder of Koh Ngiap Yong.

The guilty verdict of death for the three robbers also meant that both Wan Kamil and Ibrahim would hang for Sathick’s murder as well. Alternatively, even if their above defences were successful and they escaped the death sentence for Koh’s murder, Wan Kamil and Ibrahim would not escape from the gallows for Sathick’s murder as they would also receive the death sentence for committing armed robbery with an unlicensed firearm and illegally discharging a firearm resulting in death or injury under the Arms Offences Act of Singapore. Still, because the men were already being sentenced to execution for Koh's murder, they would not face another trial for Sathick's murder despite committing it.

== Appeal ==
After the end of their trial and sentencing, all three men - Wan Kamil bin Mohamed Shafian, Ibrahim bin Mohamed and Rosli bin Ahmat - submitted their appeals to the Court of Appeal of Singapore against their death sentences and convictions. However, in midst of the appeal hearing, Wan Kamil decided to withdraw his appeal, which finalized his death sentence while the other two continued on.

For his appeal, Rosli argued through his lawyer that he should not be guilty of murder as he was forced and coerced into doing so under the directions of Wan Kamil and there was no intention to cause Koh's death, thereby repeating his defence raised in his trial in the High Court. Ibrahim, meanwhile, insisted in his appeal that he only acted as driver and never knew that Rosli would kill Koh when he dragged the man into the bushes, which was also repetitive of the case put forward by his own defence counsel.

On 18 February 2002, both Rosli's and Ibrahim's appeals were dismissed by the three-judge Court of Appeal. The three judges - Chief Justice Yong Pung How, High Court judge Tan Lee Meng and Judge of Appeal Chao Hick Tin - were agreeable to the original trial judge Rubin’s contention that the three men were guilty based on the legal context of common intention, given that Rosli’s stabbing of the victim was in line with the trio’s intention to rob Koh regardless of their roles and in view of their awareness that weapons would be used to commit the crime and cause hurt, and that Rosli’s guilt of murder was legally established by his intention to inflict the fatal injuries on Koh that were sufficient to cause death. For this, the Court of Appeal rejected both the men's appeals and thus further sentenced both Rosli and Ibrahim to be executed for the murders of Koh Ngiap Yong and Jahabar Sathick.

== Executions ==
On 25 October 2002, all three men - Ibrahim bin Mohamed, Rosli bin Ahmat, and Wan Kamil bin Mohamed Shafian were hanged in Changi Prison. The three men were among the five executed on that Friday morning itself; two drug traffickers were executed at around the same timing as Wan Kamil, Ibrahim and Rosli.

In the aftermath of their executions, Singaporean crime show Crimewatch re-enacted the case of Koh’s murder, as well as Sathick’s murder during the second armed robbery and the process of investigations that led to the trio’s arrests and their convictions for the fatal robberies. The case was also one of the famous high-profile cases solved by police investigator Richard Lim Beng Gee, who would later retire in 2003 and eventually die from a heart attack on 16 January 2016 at the age of 65.

A 2021 article from The Smart Local named the murder of Koh Ngiap Yong as one of the 9 most terrible crimes that brought shock to Singapore in the 2000s.

== See also ==
- Capital punishment in Singapore
- List of major crimes in Singapore
