= Dewan Negara committees =

== Committee of Selection ==
=== 14th Parliament ===
Senator	Party
Rais Yatim, chairman	PN (BERSATU)
Idris Ahmad	PN (PAS)
Susan Chemerai Anding	GPS (PBB)
Lim Hui Ying	PH (DAP)

=== 13th Parliament ===
Senator	Party		Date of appointment
Abu Zahar Ujang	BN (UMNO)	Appointed	Chairman; 1 August 2013; 26 June 2014; 13 April 2015
Doris Sophia Brodi	BN (PRS)	Appointed	1 August 2013; 26 June 2014; 13 April 2015
Hou Kok Chung	BN (MCA)	Appointed	26 June 2014; 13 April 2015
Jaspal Singh Gurbakhes Singh	BN (MIC)	Appointed	1 August 2013; 26 June 2014; 13 April 2015
Johari Mat	PAS	Kelantan	13 April 2015
Koh Tsu Koon	BN (Gerakan)	Appointed	1 August 2013
Syed Husin Ali	PKR	Selangor	1 August 2013; 26 June 2014

=== 12th Parliament ===
Senator	Party		Date of appointment
Abdul Hamid Pawanteh	BN (UMNO)	Appointed	Chairman; 29 May 2008; 7 April 2009
Abu Zahar Ujang	BN (UMNO)	Appointed	Chairman; 6 May 2010
Empiang Jabu	BN (PBB)	Sarawak	29 May 2008; 7 April 2009
Kamaruddin Ambok	BN (UMNO)	Appointed	29 May 2008; 7 April 2009
Koh Tsu Koon	BN (Gerakan)	Appointed	6 May 2010
Maijol Mahap	BN (UPKO)	Sabah	6 May 2010
Mumtaz Md Nawi	PAS	Kelantan	7 April 2009; 6 May 2010
Palanivel Govindasamy	BN (MIC)	Appointed	6 May 2010
Vijayaratnam Seevaratnam	BN (Gerakan)	Appointed	29 May 2008
Wong Foon Meng	BN (MCA)	Appointed	29 May 2008; 7 April 2009

=== 11th Parliament ===
Senator	Party		Date of appointment
Abdul Hamid Pawanteh	BN (UMNO)	Appointed	Chairman; 7 June 2004; 4 May 2005; 23 May 2006; 21 May 2007
Abdul Raman Suliman	BN (UMNO)	Appointed	21 May 2007
Benedict Bujang Tembak	BN (PBB)	Sarawak	7 June 2004; 4 May 2005
Empiang Jabu	BN (PBB)	Sarawak	23 May 2006; 21 May 2007
Hamzah Zainudin	BN (UMNO)	Perak	4 May 2005; 23 May 2006
Karim Ghani	BN (UMNO)	Sabah	7 June 2004
Vijayaratnam Seevaratnam	BN (Gerakan)	Appointed	7 June 2004; 4 May 2005; 23 May 2006; 21 May 2007
Wong Foon Meng	BN (MCA)	Appointed	7 June 2004; 4 May 2005; 23 May 2006; 21 May 2007

=== 10th Parliament ===
Senator	Party		Date of appointment
Charlie Chau-Lap Chang	BN (MCA)	Appointed	8 May 2001
Christina Lorline Tibok @ Christine Vanhouten	BN (UPKO)	Sabah	17 April 2000
Gapar Gurrohu	BN (UMNO)	Appointed	8 May 2001; 8 April 2002; 14 April 2003
Ghazi @ Hasbullah Ramli	BN (UMNO)	Selangor	17 April 2000
Hamzah Zainudin	BN (UMNO)	Perak	14 April 2003
Ho Lim Teck	BN (MCA)	Malacca	8 April 2002
Jaya Partiban	BN (MIC)	Appointed	17 April 2000; 8 May 2001; 14 April 2003
Michael Chen Wing Sum	BN (MCA)	Appointed	8 May 2001; 8 April 2002
Ratnam Muthiah	BN (MIC)	Appointed	8 April 2002
Tee Thiong Hock	BN (MCA)	Selangor	17 April 2000
Yew Teong Look	BN (MCA)	Appointed	14 April 2003

=== 9th Parliament ===
Senator	Party		Date of appointment
Abdul Aziz Abdul Rahman	BN (UMNO)	Appointed	18 May 1999
Chong Kah Kiat	BN (LDP)	Appointed	10 December 1996; 12 May 1997; 12 May 1998
Ding Seling	BN (PBB)	Appointed	3 July 1995; 10 December 1996
K. Vijayanathan Kesava Pillai	BN (MIC)	Appointed	3 July 1995
Kamilia Ibrahim	BN (UMNO)	Appointed	18 May 1999
Khoo Keok Hai	BN (MCA)	Appointed	12 May 1997; 12 May 1998
Low Kai Meng	BN (MCA)	Perak	10 December 1996
Ng Yen Yen	BN (MCA)	Pahang	3 July 1995
Rahim Baba	BN (UMNO)	Appointed	3 July 1995; 10 December 1996
T. Marimuthu	BN (MIC)	Appointed	12 May 1997; 12 May 1998
V. K. K. Teagarajan	BN (MIC)	Appointed	18 May 1999
William Lau Kung Hui	BN (SNAP)	Appointed	18 May 1999
Zuki Kamaluddin	BN (UMNO)	Appointed	12 May 1997; 12 May 1998

=== 8th Parliament ===
Senator	Party		Date of appointment
Adam Kadir	BN (UMNO)	Appointed	25 May 1992; 24 May 1993
David Yeoh Eng Hock	BN (MCA)	Appointed	9 May 1994
Ding Seling	BN (PBB)	Appointed	25 May 1992; 24 May 1993; 9 May 1994
K. Vijayanathan Kesava Pillai	BN (MIC)	Appointed	9 May 1994
Mustapa Mohamed	BN (UMNO)	Appointed	9 May 1994
V. K. Sellappan	BN (MIC)	Appointed	25 May 1992; 24 May 1993
Vadiveloo Govindasamy	BN (MIC)	Appointed	Chairman; 25 May 1992
William Chek Lin Kwai	BN (MCA)	Appointed	25 May 1992; 24 May 1993

=== 7th Parliament ===
Senator	Party		Date of appointment
Hussein Ahmad	BN (UMNO)	Appointed	1 December 1986; 28 March 1988; 27 March 1989; 19 March 1990
Mak Hon Kam	BN (MCA)	Appointed	1 December 1986; 28 March 1988; 27 March 1989
Mazidah Zakaria	BN (UMNO)	Appointed	1 December 1986; 28 March 1988; 27 March 1989; 19 March 1990
Rajoo Desari @ Govindasamy	BN (MIC)	Appointed	1 December 1986; 28 March 1988
Tan Peng Khoon	BN (MCA)	Appointed	19 March 1990
Valli Muthusamy	BN (MIC)	Appointed	27 March 1989; 19 March 1990

=== 6th Parliament ===
Senator	Party		Date of appointment
Abdul Razak Abu Samah	BN (UMNO)	Appointed	9 April 1984
Abdul Razak Husain	BN (UMNO)	Appointed	19 July 1982
Abdullah Fadzil Che Wan	BN (UMNO)	Appointed	15 April 1985
G. Pasamanickam	BN (MIC)	Appointed	19 July 1982; 9 April 1984; 15 April 1985
Kam Woon Wah	BN (MCA)	Appointed	19 July 1982
Loh Fook Yen	BN (MCA)	Appointed	9 April 1984
Mohamed Nasir	BN (BERJASA)	Kelantan	19 July 1982
Mohamed Yahya	BN (UMNO)	Appointed	9 April 1984
Mohamed Yusof Mohamed Noor	BN (UMNO)	Appointed	15 April 1985
Tan Chang Soong	BN (MCA)	Appointed	15 April 1985

=== 5th Parliament ===
Senator	Party		Date of appointment
Abdul Razak Husain	BN (UMNO)	Appointed	15 December 1980; 13 April 1981; 22 March 1982
Kam Woon Wah	BN (MCA)	Appointed	23 October 1978; 7 April 1980; 13 April 1981; 22 March 1982
Kamarul Ariffin Mohd Yassin	BN (UMNO)	Appointed	23 October 1978; 7 April 1980
M. Mahalingam	BN (UMNO)	Appointed	23 October 1978; 7 April 1980; 15 December 1980; 13 April 1981; 22 March 1982
Mohamed Nasir	BN (BERJASA)	Kelantan	23 October 1978; 7 April 1980; 13 April 1981; 22 March 1982

=== 4th Parliament ===
Senator	Party		Date of appointment
Abdul Razak Husain	BN (UMNO)	Appointed	6 January 1975
Athi Nahappan	BN (MIC)	Appointed	6 January 1975; 26 April 1976
Chan Kwong Hon	BN (MCA)	Selangor	26 April 1976
Kam Woon Wah	BN (MCA)	Appointed	6 January 1975; 17 April 1978
Kamarul Ariffin Mohd Yassin	BN (UMNO)	Appointed	18 April 1977; 17 April 1978
M. Mahalingam	BN (MIC)	Appointed	17 April 1978
Nik Hassan Nik Yahya	BN (UMNO)	Appointed	26 April 1976
Othman Abdullah	BN (UMNO)	Perak	18 April 1977; 17 April 1978
Rafidah Aziz	BN (UMNO)	Appointed	26 April 1976
T. S. Gabriel	BN (MIC)	Appointed	6 January 1975
Wee Khoon Hock	BN (MCA)	Appointed	18 April 1977
V. Ponnusamy Pillai	BN (MIC)	Appointed	18 April 1977

=== 3rd Parliament ===
Senator	Party		Date of appointment
Abdul Kadir Yusuf	BN (UMNO)	Appointed	2 May 1973; 13 May 1974
Amaluddin Darus	BN (PAS)	Kelantan	2 May 1973; 13 May 1974
Chan Kwong Hon	Alliance (MCA)	Selangor	10 May 1972
Lee Yoon Thim	Alliance (MCA)	Appointed	22 March 1971
Mohamed Noor Tahir	Alliance (UMNO)	Appointed	10 May 1972
Nik Hassan Nik Yahya	Alliance (UMNO)	Appointed	22 March 1971; 10 May 1972
Syed Hassan Aidid	Alliance (UMNO)	Penang	22 March 1971; 10 May 1972; 2 May 1973; 13 May 1974
Tan Tong Hye	Alliance (MCA)	Appointed	22 March 1971
Wong Seng Chow	BN (MCA)	Appointed	2 May 1973; 13 May 1974

=== 2nd Parliament ===
Senator	Party		Date of appointment
Abdul Rahman Mohamed Yasin	Alliance (UMNO)	Appointed	Chairman; 20 May 1964; 26 May 1965; 15 June 1966; 15 June 1967; 7 June 1968
Lee Yoon Thim	Alliance (MCA)	Appointed	20 May 1964; 26 May 1965; 15 June 1966; 15 June 1967; 7 June 1968
Nik Hassan Nik Yahya	Alliance (UMNO)	Appointed	20 May 1964; 26 May 1965; 15 June 1966; 15 June 1967; 7 June 1968
Sheikh Abu Bakar Yahya	Alliance (UMNO)	Johore	20 May 1964; 26 May 1965; 15 June 1966; 15 June 1967; 7 June 1968
Tan Tong Hye	Alliance (MCA)	Appointed	20 May 1964; 26 May 1965; 15 June 1966; 15 June 1967; 7 June 1968

=== 1st Parliament ===
Senator	Party		Date of appointment
Abdul Rahman Mohamed Yasin	Alliance (UMNO)	Appointed	Chairman; 11 December 1959; 2 May 1960; 2 May 1961; 7 May 1962; 3 June 1963
Ahmad Said	Alliance (UMNO)	Perak	11 December 1959
Khaw Kai Boh	Alliance (MCA)	Appointed	3 June 1963
Leong Yew Koh	Alliance (MCA)	Appointed	11 December 1959; 2 May 1960; 2 May 1961; 7 May 1962
Nik Hassan Nik Yahya	Alliance (UMNO)	Appointed	11 December 1959; 2 May 1960; 2 May 1961; 7 May 1962; 3 June 1963
Raja Rastam Shahrome Raja Said Tauphy	Alliance (UMNO)	Selangor	2 May 1960; 2 May 1961; 7 May 1962; 3 June 1963
Tan Tong Hye	Alliance (MCA)	Appointed	11 December 1959; 2 May 1960; 2 May 1961; 7 May 1962; 3 June 1963

== House Committee ==
=== 14th Parliament ===
Senator	Party
Rais Yatim, chairman	PN (BERSATU)
Razali Idris	PN (BERSATU)
Sabani Mat	BN (UMNO)
Mohd Apandi Mohamad	PN (PAS)
Ismail Yusop	PH (PKR)

== Committee of Privileges ==
=== 14th Parliament ===
Senator	Party
Rais Yatim, chairman	PN (BERSATU)
Asmak Husin	PN (PAS)
Yaakob Sapari	PH (PKR)
Kesavadas A. Achyuthan Nair	PH (DAP)

== Standing Order Committee ==
=== 14th Parliament ===
Senator	Party
Rais Yatim, chairman	PN (BERSATU)
Othman Aziz	BN (UMNO)
Zaiedi Suhaili	GPS (PBB)
Robert Lau Hui Yiew	GPS (SUPP)
Alan Ling SIe Kiong	PH (DAP)
Raj Munni Sabu	PH (AMANAH)
Theodore Douglas Lind	WARISAN
