= Murder of Lee Kok Yin =

1995 murder of a taxi driver by four Thais in Singapore

Lee Kok Yin
- Lee Kok Yin, who died from a knife wound to his neck
- Born: Lee Kok Yin; 1948; Colony of Singapore
- Died: 22 January 1995 (aged 47); Woodlands, Singapore
- Cause of death: Murdered
- Occupation: Taxi driver (former)
- Employer: ComfortDelGro
- Known for: Murder victim
- Children: 2

On 22 January 1995, 47-year-old Lee Kok Yin (Chinese: 李国贤; pinyin: Lǐ Guóxián; Jyutping: Lei5 Gwok3 Jin4), a taxi driver, was murdered by four Thai workers during an attempted robbery at Woodlands, Singapore. After four months of investigation, two of the four suspects were arrested while the remaining two attackers remained at large.

After their arrests, the first two suspects, Pracha Thanomnin and Kraisak Sakha, were charged and brought to trial for one count of murdering Lee and sentenced to death, although only Pracha's death sentence was upheld upon appeal while Kraisak's punishment was commuted to six strokes of the cane (which was later commuted) and five years' imprisonment for a reduced charge of attempted robbery. Pracha, who lost his appeal, was eventually hanged on 10 January 1997. As of today, the other two alleged killers, identified only as "Dorn" and "Wan", are still at large.

== Murder ==
On 22 January 1995, two policemen on patrol nearby a construction site in Woodlands discovered the corpse of a taxi driver inside his taxi (its engine was still running), which was abandoned at the area itself.

The victim, identified as 47-year-old Lee Kok Yin, had a gaping knife wound on the right side of his neck, and according to forensic pathologist Dr Wee Keng Poh, the wound itself was fatal enough to cause Lee to die from an excessive loss of blood. His watch and cash (SGD$129 in his shirt pocket and SGD$20 in his wallet) were left untouched in the taxi and both a wallet and a bloodstained cap was also left behind. The police believed that the motive was robbery, and it was likely that the assailant(s) could have pretended to be passengers in order to board Lee's taxi before attempting to rob and also kill him.

Known to be a dedicated father and husband and also a good co-worker with a thrifty personality, Lee was married with a seven-year-old son and 15-year-old daughter at the time of his death, and lived in a HDB flat at Jurong East. All of Lee's family members (including his sister, wife and children), friends and colleagues were devastated to receive news of his death, hoping that the alleged killer(s) be brought to justice. They also could not understand why did the attacker(s) target Lee, who did not have any bad relationships and often dedicated himself to an honest living. It was revealed that a long time ago, Lee was also a victim of robbery but unlike the present case where he was murdered, Lee escaped unharmed after he willingly handed over his valuables to the robber(s); it was not known if the culprits of this prior case were arrested and convicted. Aside from this, Lee had worked for seven to eight years as a taxi driver before his death.

== Investigations ==
The Singapore Police Force classified the death of Lee Kok Yin as murder, and the investigations, led by Inspector Richard Lim Beng Gee, swiftly began, starting with the interrogation of nearly 300 foreign workers living in the dormitories nearby the crime scene, and Commander Heng Swee Keat, who would eventually become Singapore's 11th Deputy Prime Minister, ordered an operation to search the crime scene and activated 150 policemen to take part in the operation. A month later, police investigators also released a public appeal, seeking the assistance of one Thai worker named Sowat Jaroensil in their investigations behind the killing of Lee.

Four months after Lee was murdered, on 8 May 1995, Kraisak Sakha, a 25-year-old illegal worker who hailed from Thailand, was approached by the police at a construction site, where he was arrested as a suspect for murdering Lee Kok Yin. Twelve days later, on 20 May 1995, after he was drunk and brought to hospital, 28-year-old Thai worker Pracha Thanomnin, one of Kraisak's three alleged accomplices, was arrested and charged for killing the taxi driver four months before. The remaining two assailants, known only as "Wan" and "Dorn", were never caught.

== Trial of Kraisak and Pracha ==
On 8 January 1996, both Kraisak and Pracha stood trial at the High Court for a single count of murdering Lee Kok Yin. Pracha was represented by N Ganesan and Abdul Salim, while Kraisak was represented by Ang Chin Peng and Mohamed Muzammil Mohamed. Mathavan Devadas was in charge of prosecuting both Pracha and Kraisak, whose cases were jointly presided by Judicial Commissioner Amarjeet Singh.

During the trial (and earlier during police investigations), Kraisak confessed that he was present at the crime scene but he never killed the taxi driver. Instead, he pinpointed Pracha as the person who directly killed Lee during the robbery bid. Kraisak's account was that on 22 January 1995 itself, after they had hatched a plan to commit robbery, Pracha, Wan, Dorn and he himself hailed a taxi, driven by Lee, from Hougang to Woodlands, where their dormitory were located. Kraisak testified that after reaching Woodlands, when he was waiting for the taxi driver to return him the change, he witnessed Pracha suddenly brandishing a knife and plunged it into the taxi driver's throat, resulting in the death of Lee, who resisted during the stabbing. Kraisak tried to leave the taxi and did not want to partake in the stabbing but he was stopped from leaving by the others. Kraisak added that during the stabbing, Wan was the one who restrained the taxi driver. Although they wanted to steal the belongings (specifically money and valuables) of Lee, the four workers quickly abandoned the attempt and left the crime scene after they spotted a passing vehicle heading towards the location. During the escape, Kraisak accidentally dropped his wallet (containing his access card written with Kraisak's fake identity) at the taxi, which resulted in his arrest four months after Lee was murdered.

Pracha, on the other hand, completely denied that he participated in the robbery-murder and rather, he put up an alibi defence that he and some friends were drinking alcohol at another location at the time of the murder, although his claims were not corroborated by any witnesses of the trial. Pracha repeatedly denied the contentions of the prosecution and Kraisak's defence counsel that he actually participated in the robbery and murder, and even claimed that he was not aware of the crime until he overheard Kraisak and the two missing killers Wan and Dorn discussing about killing a man during a robbery attempt.

On 30 January 1996, Judicial Commissioner Singh delivered his verdict. Singh found that both Pracha and Kraisak, together with both "Dorn" and "Wan", had the common intention to commit robbery, and he found that the stabbing of Lee by Pracha was done in furtherance of the group's common intention (rendering every member responsible for causing Lee's death), and Pracha also possessed the intent to cause fatal harm to Lee. Consequently, Singh rejected Pracha's alibi defence and also in turn, rejected Kraisak's argument that he never had the intention to commit murder.

On these grounds, Singh found both Kraisak and Pracha guilty of the murder of Lee, and sentenced both of them to the mandatory capital punishment upon their conviction.

== Kraisak's appeal and reprieve ==
After he was sentenced to death, Kraisak appealed his conviction and sentence. His appeal was heard four months after the end of his trial.

On 24 May 1996, the Court of Appeal's three judges - M Karthigesu, L P Thean and Goh Joon Seng - unanimously allowed Kraisak's appeal, and set aside both his death sentence and murder conviction. Justice Karthigesu, who delivered the appellate court's ruling, stated that based on their review of Kraisak's statements, it was clear that Kraisak confessed to committing robbery but not murder, and although there was a common intention between the robbers to commit robbery, there was more than a reasonable doubt with regards to the true extent of Kraisak's continued involvement in the robbery-murder, since he has showed signs of backing out during the stabbing of Lee and had "discerned a show of violence", and there was an inference that the knife could only be meant to intimidate Lee. Therefore, they decided to give Kraisak the benefit of the doubt, and instead found him guilty of attempted robbery, and sentenced him to five years of imprisonment with six strokes of the cane. Kraisak's lawyer Mohamed Muzammil Mohamed submitted a mitigation plea before the appellate court's sentencing that Kraisak wished to return home as early as possible and was plagued with trauma over the robbery and murder of Lee. Kraisak's sentence was backdated to the date of his arrest on 8 May 1995.

Four months later, in September 1996, Kraisak re-appeared in court, filing a motion to be spared from caning on medical grounds. Prison doctors had examined Kraisak and found that he was medically unfit to receive caning, due to Kraisak being diagnosed with an unspecified terminal illness. Mohamed, who remained as Kraisak's lawyer, additionally argued that his client should not be given another jail term in lieu of caning on behalf of his poor health condition and revealed that Kraisak wished to return to Thailand as early as possible in order to spend his remaining days there with his family. After hearing the appeal, the Court of Appeal agreed to allow Kraisak to only serve five years in prison as previously ruled but spared him from the cane. They also agreed to Mohamed's request to not extend his client's prison sentence in lieu of caning.

== Fate of Pracha ==
Pracha also filed an appeal and it was heard in the same court as Kraisak's. Pracha once again put forward his alibi defence during the appeal hearing in an effort to absolve himself from the murder charge, but on 24 May 1996, the Court of Appeal rejected Pracha's appeal, after they found that there was sufficient evidence that Pracha intentionally inflicted the fatal injury on Lee, and noted that Pracha did not call for any witnesses to corroborate his claim of alibi, therefore they upheld Pracha's conviction and sentence.

On the morning of 10 January 1997, 30-year-old Pracha Thanomnin was hanged in Changi Prison.

== See also ==
- Capital punishment in Singapore
