= Richard Lim Beng Gee =

Singaporean police detective

Richard Lim Beng Gee (Chinese: 林明义; pinyin: Lín Míngyì; 29 November 1951 - 16 January 2016) was a police detective in the Singapore Police Force. He was known to the local Chinese newspapers as "Singapore's Sherlock Holmes" for his crime-solving skills.

== Biography ==
Lim was born in Penang, Malaysia. At the age of 20, he travelled to Singapore for a job interview with the Police Force, and joined the police force in 1972. During his 31-year career, he helped solve many notable crimes, such as the case of Anthony Ler, who paid a 15-year youth to kill his wife Annie Leong in 2001.

Lim retired from the police force in 2003 due to his worsening diabetes.

On 16 January 2016, Lim, aged 65, died from a heart attack.

== Notable cases ==
- 1999 Bukit Timah kidnapping
- Contract killing of Annie Leong (Anthony Ler)
- Murder of Iordanka Apostolova
- Murder of Lee Kok Cheong
- Murder of Lee Kok Yin
- Murder of Yeu Lam Ching
- Murders of Koh Ngiap Yong and Jahabar Sathick
- Oriental Hotel murder
