= Murder of Yeu Lam Ching =

1988 murder of a lorry driver in Singapore

Yeu Lam Ching
- Born: Yeu Lam Ching; 1939; Singapore, Straits Settlements
- Died: 25 March 1988 (aged 49); Bukit Timah, Singapore
- Cause of death: Murdered
- Other names: Yew Lam Ching
- Occupation: Lorry driver
- Employer: Sin Hup Lee Timber Trading Private Ltd
- Known for: Murder victim
- Children: 4

On 25 March 1988, at Bukit Timah, 49-year-old lorry driver Yeu Lam Ching (Chinese: 杨云清; pinyin: Yáng Yúnqīng; Pe̍h-ōe-jī: Iûⁿ Hûn-chheng) was robbed and murdered by two men. The two men, Abdul Aziz Abdul Rahman and Mazlan Maidun, were swiftly arrested and charged with murder. Mazlan, who directly stabbed the victim to death with a knife, was found guilty of murder and sentenced to death, while Abdul Aziz, who only robbed the victim and never took part in the stabbing, was found guilty of armed robbery and thus jailed for ten years and given 12 strokes of the cane. Mazlan was hanged on 21 January 1994 after losing his appeal.

== Murder ==
On 25 March 1988, at a forested area in Bukit Timah, a 49-year-old lorry driver was found dead in front of his parked lorry, with three stab wounds on his neck. According to Professor Chao Tzee Cheng, the forensic pathologist who performed an autopsy on the victim, he found that the lorry driver had a total of four knife wounds inflicted on his neck with great force, and two of them were fatal, and it caused the lorry driver to die within five to ten minutes. Professor Chao also stated that the estimated time of death was between midnight and 2am on the morning of 25 March, the same date when the lorry driver's corpse was found by police officers in a passing patrol car (who were searching for a suspect of a taxi robbery that happened nearby). The case was classified as murder, and police detective Richard Lim Beng Gee led the police investigations in the murder of the lorry driver.

The murdered lorry driver, identified as Yeu Lam Ching, was married with two daughters and two sons, and he resided at Jurong West. One of Yew's daughters, a 28-year-old school-teacher, stated that her father was hard working and kind to his friends and family. His colleagues were also shocked to hear that he had been murdered. The murder of Yeu Lam Ching was one of the three murder cases to happen within 24 hours during the same week. Aside from the present case, another involved a 30-year-old nightclub waitress Chan Siew Ying who was killed by her 38-year-old husband Loo Beng Hoe (later jailed for five years for manslaughter) and 34-year-old Thai worker Thongdam Sarathit who was axed to death by his 35-year-old compatriot Somwang Phattanasaeng (later sentenced to death for murder).

On 29 March 1988, four days after Lam was murdered, a 23-year-old suspect and labourer was arrested at Woodbridge Hospital (now known as the Institute of Mental Health). The suspect, identified as Mazlan bin Maidun, was charged with murder the next day.

Soon after Mazlan was caught, his accomplice, a 29-year-old postman named Abdul Aziz bin Abdul Rahman was arrested on 31 March 1988. He was also charged with murder on 2 April 1988.

== Trial of Mazlan and Abdul Aziz ==
=== Court hearing ===
On 13 April 1992, both Mazlan bin Maidun and Abdul Aziz bin Abdul Rahman were brought to trial at the High Court for one count of murdering Yeu Lam Ching back in 1988. Lee Sing Lit led the prosecution of the trial, while Joseph Gay represented Mazlan and B Jeyabalan represented Abdul Aziz. The trial was presided by two judges: Justice S Rajendran and Judicial Commissioner Goh Phai Cheng. It was the prosecution's contention that both Mazlan and Abdul Aziz had participated in the robbery-murder of Yeu after they ambushed him while he was resting and smoking outside his lorry in Bukit Timah, and both robbers were said to have stolen cash and valuables worth S$177 from Yeu after killing him.

Mazlan was first asked to give his defence and he elected to do so. During his police interrogation, Mazlan stated that he armed the knife because he wanted to use it to rob Yeu but never intended to kill him. He stated that when he attacked Yeu, he used the knife to stab Yeu but never exert a lot of force during the stabbing. Mazlan also claimed on the stand that he ate sleeping pills and drank alcohol before the crime, and due to the effects of intoxication by alcohol and sleeping pills, he cannot remember exactly how he stabbed the lorry driver.

Abdul Aziz elected to remain silent when his defence was called next. However, his police statements were read out in court, and his version of events was that, he never took part in the murder but only admitted to committing robbery. Abdul Aziz recounted that due to his need for money to prepare for his upcoming wedding, he agreed to Mazlan's plan to rob a Chinese woman (who operated a nearby gambling den), but the original target never appeared at the venue of their first attempt. Therefore, they changed their target and instead attacked Yeu. According to Abdul Aziz, he witnessed Mazlan approaching the victim and attacked him, and Abdul Aziz himself came from behind to grab onto Yeu's hands, and during which, he witnessed Mazlan stabbing Yeu with a knife. Abdul Aziz maintained that he was unarmed, he never took part in the stabbing, and that he only robbed Yau.

=== Verdict ===
On 23 May 1992, the two trial judges - Judicial Commissioner Goh Phai Cheng and Justice S Rajendran - delivered their verdict.

In the case of Mazlan, the two judges found that Mazlan had intentionally knifed Yeu four times on his neck, such that two of these stab wounds were sufficient in the ordinary course of nature to cause death, and instead of using very little force as he claimed, Mazlan had evidently used a great amount of force to inflict the wounds as corroborated by the autopsy findings of Professor Chao Tzee Cheng. They also found that Mazlan did not suffer from diminished responsibility due to drug or alcohol intoxication at the time of the offence, and opined that he was fully conscious and aware of his actions at the time of the killing. Therefore, 27-year-old Mazlan bin Maidun was found guilty of murder and sentenced to death. Under Section 302 of the Penal Code, the death penalty was mandated as the sole punishment for murder upon an offender's conviction. Mazlan's younger sister (who was present in court) was reportedly devastated to hear that her brother was given the death sentence for killing Yeu.

In the case of Abdul Aziz, the two judges found that the evidence against Abdul Aziz only showed that he was a mere participant in the robbery but was not involved in the stabbing, and Abdul Aziz himself confessed to only committing robbery but not murder, and never had the knowledge that Mazlan was armed with a knife prior to the robbery-murder. They also noted that Mazlan never implicated Abdul Aziz in the stabbing, and there was only a small portion of the statement illustrating how Abdul Aziz held on to Yeu's hands a while before and during the stabbing. Therefore, the two judges found it was unsafe to convict Abdul Aziz of murder on the grounds of insufficient evidence to determine the full extent of his conduct, and also chose to refrain from drawing an adverse inference through Abdul Aziz's decision to remain silent. In conclusion, 33-year-old Abdul Aziz bin Abdul Rahman was sentenced to ten years in prison and 12 strokes of the cane for a reduced charge of armed robbery, after the trial judges acquitted him of murder. Abdul Aziz's sentence was backdated to the date of his arrest on 31 March 1988.

== Mazlan's appeal ==
In July 1992, while Mazlan bin Maidun was appealing against his conviction and sentence, the prosecution simultaneously filed a motion to challenge the trial judge's decision to reject Mazlan's police statement. A small portion of the trial verdict stated that both judges agreed with Mazlan's defence counsel that he should have been informed of the right to remain silent during his interrogation by police and thus rejected his statement as evidence. Nonetheless, in general, the conviction of Mazlan for murder was based on the other sources of evidence presented in the court.

The appeal of Mazlan was heard by the Court of Appeal in October 1992, during which the prosecution's motion was also heard. From the appellant Mazlan's side, not only did his lawyer J B Jeyaretnam against his conviction and sentence, Jeyaretnam also argued that the failure of the police to inform Mazlan of his right to remain silent during police questioning was a breach of his constitutional rights. He also cited that this did not uphold Mazlan's right to equality under the law since he made the statements without the knowledge that he could remain silent. However, the prosecution (led by Bala Reddy) argued that the police never had the duty by the rule of law to tell suspects that they had the right to remain silent during police questioning. National University of Singapore's law school lecturer and practicing lawyer Choo Han Teck, who was appointed as the amicus curae for the prosecution, also submitted to the court that the constitution did not have a doctrine to obligate police investigators to inform suspects that they could remain silent during interrogation, and there was no right for suspects to remain silent during their interrogation for criminal charges.

On 13 October 1992, the Court of Appeal's three-judge panel, consisting of Chief Justice Yong Pung How, High Court judge Lai Kew Chai and Judge of Appeal Chao Hick Tin, delivered their judgement. They found that there was overwhelming evidence against Mazlan and it was sufficient grounds to prove him guilty of the murder of Yeu Lam Ching and hence, they dismissed his appeal. Aside from this, they accepted the prosecution's arguments, stating that there was no constitutional right for suspects to remain silent during interrogation, and that the constitution provided no obligation for police to inform the suspects that they had the right to remain silent. The three judges also opined that as long as a statement was made voluntarily, whether or not the suspect was told by police to tell the truth or remain silent, it was still admissible as evidence. The verdict was also a significant landmark due to its ruling on the validity of constitutional rights for suspects to exercise the right to silence.

== Mazlan's execution ==
On 21 January 1994, for the charge of murdering Yeu Lam Ching nearly six years prior, 29-year-old Mazlan bin Maidun was hanged in Changi Prison at dawn. On the same day when Mazlan was executed, two convicted drug traffickers, a Hongkonger named Wong Wai Hung (aged 33) and a Singaporean named Tan Nguan Siah (aged 39), were both put to death at the same prison for trafficking 4.6kg of heroin and 46.44g of heroin respectively in separate cases. They were among the first people to be hanged in Singapore during the year 1994 itself; Wong and Tan were the 43rd and 44th persons to be executed under the Misuse of Drugs Act 1975 after the mandatory death sentence was implemented for drug trafficking.

More than a year after Mazlan was hanged, the murder of Yeu Lam Ching was re-enacted by Singaporean crime show Crimewatch in June 1995.

The case of Mazlan bin Maidun was cited as one of the cases related to the review of police investigation procedures to ensure there was no abuse and ruling of the admissibility of a confession in court per the voluntariness of the statement made.

Abdul Aziz Abdul Rahman, Mazlan's accomplice who escaped the gallows, was released since 1998 after completing his ten-year sentence in prison.

== See also ==
- Caning in Singapore
- Capital punishment in Singapore
- List of major crimes in Singapore
