= Depot Road =

Coordinates: 1°16′57″N 103°48′34″E

- Subzone of Bukit Merah Planning Area

Other transcription(s)
  - Chinese: 德普路; Tek-phó͘-lō͘ (Hokkien POJ); Dak1 Pou2 Lou6 (Cantonese Jyutping)
- Interactive map of Depot Road
- Country: Singapore
- Region: Central Region
- Planning Area: Bukit Merah

Depot Road (Chinese: 德普路; Jyutping: Dak1 Pou2 Lou6; Pe̍h-ōe-jī: Tek-phó͘-lō͘) is a subzone within the planning area of Bukit Merah, Singapore, as defined by the Urban Redevelopment Authority (URA). Its boundary is made up of the Ayer Rajah Expressway (AYE) in the north; Alexandra Road in the west; Depot Road in the south; and Henderson Road in the east.

"Depot Road" is also the name of a two-way road in the area. The subzone took its name from this road.
