= Whampoa Secondary School =

- 黄埔中学

Location
- Singapore
- Coordinates: 1.3144°N 103.8828°E

Information
- School type: Government-Aided; Co-educational
- Motto: 德、智、体、群 (Towards an all round education)
- Established: 1961
- Status: Defunct
- Closed: 1994

Whampoa Secondary School (Chinese: 黄埔中学) (formerly Whampoa Secondary School(Chinese) (Chinese: 黄埔华文中学) ) was a secondary school in Kallang, Singapore.

== School history ==
Whampoa Secondary School was established in 1961 at St. Wilfred Road as a Chinese middle school. The school was named after Mr. Whampoa Hoo Ah Kay, a pioneer merchant who also served as the first Chinese member of the Singapore Legislative Council in 1867. The school was recognised for their values-driven education and discipline.

In 1978, Whampoa Secondary School (Chinese) was initially included in the list of newly established Special Assistance Plan Schools. However, with the concern from the Ministry of Education over the quality of students admitted, the number of SAP schools were amended to nine, which excluded Whampoa Secondary School (Chinese). The school was converted to an integrated school, and renamed Whampoa Secondary School in the 1980s, to enrol students from the English Language streams due to falling enrolment (and declining popularity of Chinese schools). The school was eventually closed in 1994 with insufficient cohort size.
