= Revolutionary Command Council =

Revolutionary Command Council may refer to:

- Egyptian Revolutionary Command Council, body established to supervise Egypt after the 1952 Revolution
- Revolutionary Command Council (Iraq), ultimate decision-making body in Iraq before the 2003 invasion
- National Council for the Revolutionary Command, ultimate decision-making body in Syria in much of the 1960s
- Libyan Revolutionary Command Council, twelve-people body that governed Libya after the 1969 Revolution
- National Revolutionary Command Council (Sudan), ten-people body that governed Sudan after the 1969 coup d'état
- Revolutionary Command Council for National Salvation, body that governed Sudan after the 1989 coup d'état
- Syrian Revolutionary Command Council, an alliance of Syrian rebel groups

== See also ==
- RCC (disambiguation)
- Revolutionary Council (disambiguation)
