= Revolutionary committee =

Revolutionary committee may refer to:

- Revolutionary committee (China), committees that took over the functions of government during the Cultural Revolution
- Revolutionary Committee (Persia), played a role in the Persian Constitutional Revolution of 1905–1911
- Revolutionary committee (Soviet), Bolshevik provisional governments in envisioned Soviet republics
  - Galician Revolutionary Committee
  - Siberian Revolutionary Committee
  - Provisional Polish Revolutionary Committee
  - Military Revolutionary Committee
- Supreme Revolutionary Committee, the unrecognized acting government of Yemen
- Revolutionary Committee of the Batavian Republic
- Revolutionary Committee of the Chinese Kuomintang
- Revolutionary Committee of Puerto Rico
- Revolutionary Committee (Haiti)
- Bulgarian Revolutionary Central Committee
- Bulgarian Secret Central Revolutionary Committee
- Islamic Revolution Committees, Iran
- Punjab Communist Revolutionary Committee, India
- Revolutionary Committee of Unity and Action
- Revolutionary Committee (Gabon), a faction in the 1964 Gabonese coup d'état

== See also ==
- Revolutionary Council (disambiguation)
- Revolutionary Command Council (disambiguation)
- Workers' council
