= List of the Czech Republic Senate committees =

This is a complete list of all committees currently operating in the Senate of the Czech Republic.

== Committees ==
- Committee on Agenda and Procedure
  - Chairperson: Milan Štěch
    - 1st Vice-Chairperson: Přemysl Sobotka
      - Vice-Chairpersons:
        - Ivo Bárek
        - Miluše Horská
        - Zdeněk Škromach
          - members:
            - Zdeňka Hamousová
            - Jan Horník
            - Jiří Oberfalzer
            - Petr Šilar
            - Dagmar Terelmešová
            - Jan Veleba
            - Petr Vícha
            - Veronika Vrecionová
- Committee on Mandate and Parliamentary Privilege
  - Chairperson: Jiří Oberfalzer
    - Vice-Chairpersons:
      - Zdeněk Besta
      - Jaroslav Malý
      - Leopold Sulovský
        - members:
          - Miroslav Antl
          - Jiří Carbol
          - Jaroslav Kubera
          - Jan Látka
          - Miloš Malý
          - Jaroslav Palas
          - Jaroslav Zeman
- Committee on Legal and Constitutional Affairs
  - Chairperson: Miroslav Antl
    - Vice-Chairpersons:
      - Jiří Burian
      - Stanislav Juránek
      - Miloš Malý
      - Radek Sušil
        - members:
          - Jaroslav Kubera
          - Miroslav Nenutil
          - Emilie Třísková
          - Eliška Wagnerová
- Committee on National Economy, Agriculture and Transport
  - Chairperson: Ivan Adamec
    - Vice-Chairpersons:
      - Karel Kratochvíle
      - Jaromír Strnad
      - Veronika Vrecionová
        - members:
          - František Bradáč
          - Petr Bratský
          - František Čuba
          - Jiří Hlavatý
          - Libor Michálek
          - Leopold Sulovský
          - Petr Šilar
          - Pavel Štohl
          - Jan Veleba
- Committee on Public Administration, Regional Development and the Environment
  - Chairperson: Miloš Vystrčil
    - Vice-Chairpersons:
      - Pavel Eybert
      - Petr Gawlas
      - Jitka Seitlová
      - Martin Tesařík
        - members:
          - Jiří Carbol
          - Zdeňka Hamousová
          - Jan Horník
          - Zbyněk Linhart
          - Radko Martínek
          - Ivo Valenta
          - Petr Vícha
- Committee on Education, Science, Culture, Human Rights and Petitions
  - Chairperson: Jaromír Jermář
    - Vice-Chairpersons:
      - Zdeněk Berka
      - Milan Pešák
      - Eva Syková
      - Jiří Šesták
        - members:
          - Zuzana Baudyšová
          - Jiří Čunek
          - Václav Homolka
          - Jaroslav Malý
          - Jiří Oberfalzer
- Committee on Foreign Affairs, Defence and Security
  - Chairperson: František Bublan
    - Vice-Chairpersons:
      - Zdeněk Brož
      - Tomáš Jirsa
      - Hassan Mezian
      - Josef Táborský
        - members:
          - Lubomír Franc
          - Patrik Kunčar
          - Václav Láska
          - Jaroslav Palas
          - Jozef Regec
- Committee on EU Affairs
  - Chairperson: Václav Hampl
    - Vice-Chairpersons:
      - Jaroslav Doubrava
      - Jan Látka
      - Antonín Maštalíř
      - members:
        - Lumír Aschenbrenner
        - Zdeněk Besta
        - Tomáš Grulich
        - Luděk Jeništa
        - Peter Koliba
- Committee on Health and Social Policy
  - Chairperson: Jan Žaloudík
    - Vice-Chairpersons:
      - Alena Dernerová
      - Milada Emmerová
      - Vladimír Plaček
      - Jaroslav Zeman
        - members:
          - Ivana Cabrnochová
          - Daniela Filipiová
          - Zdeněk Papoušek
          - Božena Sekaninová
          - Alena Šromová
          - Dagmar Terelmešová
          - Jiří Vosecký
