= Sadli =

Sadli is a given name and surname found in Indonesia and Singapore. Notable people with this name include:

- Mohammad Sadli (1922 – 2008), an Indonesian economist
- Muhammad Sadli bin Razali, a police officer involved in the 2015 Khoo Teck Puat Hospital shooting in Singapore
- Saparinah Sadli (born 1927), an Indonesian psychologist

== See also ==
- Sadly, the adverbial form of "sad"
