= Leslie Khoo =

Singaporean convicted murderer

Leslie Khoo Kwee Hock
- Born: c. 1968; Singapore
- Status: Imprisoned at Changi Prison since July 2016
- Conviction: Murder under Section 300(b) of the Penal Code (1 count)
- Penalty: Life imprisonment

Details
- Victims: 1 for murder, several for cheating
- Date: 2001, 2004, 2006, 2011 and 12 July 2016
- Country: Singapore
- Date apprehended: 20 July 2016

Leslie Khoo Kwee Hock (Chinese: 邱贵福; pinyin: Qiū Guìfú; born c. 1968) is a Singaporean criminal who was convicted of the murder of his Chinese girlfriend Cui Yajie (Chinese: 崔雅洁; pinyin: Cuī Yǎjié), with whom he had an extra-marital affair. Khoo, who had previously been criminally convicted for cheating and forgery, argued with his girlfriend in a car on 12 July 2016. The argument turned violent and Khoo strangled Cui in a moment of anger. Later, Khoo took Cui's corpse to a forest in Lim Chu Kang, where he burned the body for three days before he was arrested on 20 July 2016.

Khoo was found guilty of murder three years after his arrest and sentenced to life imprisonment. His case was the second murder conviction without a body after the high-profile Sunny Ang trial in 1965. The murder of Cui Yajie, which took place near Gardens by the Bay, became known as the Gardens by the Bay murder to the public.

== Personal life ==
Leslie Khoo Kwee Hock was born in Singapore in 1968. Khoo married twice, first in 1995 before he divorced and married another woman in 2001. He fathered a son in 2004 with his second wife. He used to be the owner of a successful business, and in 2001, due to a debt of S$300,000, he strangled his wife, leading to a personal protection order filed against him, before their relationship recovered. At another point, Khoo once again strangled his wife, as a result of her discovering his adultery, and she filed a personal protection order. Through counselling, their relationship was again repaired.

Khoo was first convicted in 2004 of criminal breach of trust and sentenced to six months in jail, and he had also been convicted for forgery. Seven years later, he was found guilty of a similar offence and served a longer 16-month jail term. He also twice committed offences related to misuse of computers in 2001 and 2016. Khoo turned to Christianity in prison and later became a volunteer of a welfare group for ex-convicts. He was later employed as a retail manager of a laundry business, helping former prisoners find jobs in the same business. Khoo's supervisor and colleagues noted that he was a good employee.

== Gardens by the Bay murder ==
=== Background ===
Cui Yajie, the 31-year-old victim.

Leslie Khoo continued to have affairs outside his marriage, and continued to cheat them of money. One of his lovers was 31-year-old Chinese national Cui Yajie.

Cui Yajie, an only child, was an engineer born in Tianjin, China. Cui, who graduated from University of Southampton, first came to work in Singapore in 2012, and had gained permanent residence status during her next three years in Singapore. Khoo and Cui first met in 2015 outside the home of her former boyfriend (with whom she had just broken up), where he comforted her. Later, they began a relationship after he claimed that he was single and was the owner of a laundry business. When Cui became suspicious, Khoo told her that he was divorced. Khoo's wife later got wind of her husband's relationship with Cui after Cui sent her a message on Facebook to demand that Khoo's wife leave Khoo alone.

The relationship would later on be riddled with quarrels over Khoo spending less time with Cui and a debt of $20,000 which he owed her for making an investment in gold. Half of that amount was eventually paid back by Khoo, who asked a former lover to, on his behalf, remit the money in Cui's father's bank account.

=== Murder ===
On 12 July 2016, Cui Yajie wanted to go to Khoo's workplace, supposedly to expose Khoo's lies, but Khoo intercepted her, and he offered to drive her to his workplace. He subsequently took her to a secluded place near Gardens by the Bay, where he intended to calm her down and dissuade her from meeting his supervisor. However, the couple's argument grew fiercer, and in the heat of the quarrel, Khoo lost control of his temper and strangled Cui Yajie to death. After, he drove aimlessly around Singapore, then went back home at night with Cui's corpse, which was covered in laundry bags, still hidden in the car. The next day, Khoo took the body to a forest in Lim Chu Kang after buying some charcoal and kerosene, where he burned it for three consecutive days.

On 17 July 2016, after the police investigated into Cui's disappearance, Khoo, who was the last person to see her before her death, was arrested as a suspect. Khoo later confessed to the killing and he led the police to the place where he burned the body. By the time the police got there, there were only a few clumps of hair, a bra hook and partially burnt pieces of Cui's dress left at the site. Khoo was charged with murder and remanded in the case of Cui's death. This murder case became known as the "Gardens by the Bay murder" in media reports. Leslie Khoo also faced charges of cheating and embezzling a total of S$88,600 from his company and his four other lovers prior to murdering Cui.

== Trial and life imprisonment ==
=== Court hearing and conviction ===
When his trial started in the High Court of Singapore in March 2019, Khoo, then 50 years old, denied having an affair with Cui or having intended to kill Cui. His lawyers waged the defence of diminished responsibility against the murder charge by citing his intermittent explosive disorder (IED), which arguably made him unable to control himself, leading to the impulsive strangling. The defence also included both sudden and grave provocation and sudden fight, as Khoo pinpointed the blame on Cui for assaulting him and insulting him during the argument prior to her death. The prosecution's psychiatrist noted that Khoo was capable of self-control at the time of the strangulation, and the prosecution noted numerous lies and discrepancies in Khoo's account.

After an 11-day trial that lasted from March to July 2019, on 18 July 2019, Khoo was convicted of murder under Section 300(b) of the Penal Code. The trial judge, Audrey Lim of the High Court, dismissed all of Khoo's defences. The judge stated that based on the claim of sudden fight and Cui's smaller body size, it is more likely that Khoo acted in a cruel and unusual manner, and that Cui never physically abused Khoo at all; it would have been clear to Khoo that pressing Cui's neck with great force would likely lead to her death. Justice Lim additionally rejected Khoo's claim that he cremated Cui's body to allow her to rest in peace, and further affirmed that Khoo indeed had an affair with Cui despite his repeated denials. Due to the guilty verdict, Khoo would either be sentenced to death, or to life imprisonment.

=== Submissions and verdict ===
The prosecution, led by Hri Kumar Nair, sought a life sentence for Khoo in their final submissions on sentence, while the defence asked for the sentence to be backdated to Khoo's date of remand. After adjourning sentencing for a month, on 19 August 2019, Justice Lim decided in her sentencing verdict that Khoo did not show any blatant disregard for human life or viciousness from the manner of killing, so his case would not warrant the death penalty. She also accepted that there was no premeditation to kill Cui Yajie on Khoo's part, as his intention, before the killing, was to calm her down and dissuade her from confronting his supervisors.

Justice Lim also noted that while Khoo had gone to great lengths to dispose the body to cover up his crime and never called for help when Cui went motionless, it was not a relevant factor to be considered during sentencing. Due to the cremation of the body, it was also hard to ascertain the true extent of the injuries, to observe the degree of viciousness exhibited in the manner of the killing. She therefore decided to sentence 51-year-old Leslie Khoo Kwee Hock to life imprisonment and backdate Khoo's life term to the date of his remand, as Khoo's lawyers requested (and which the prosecution did not object to). Khoo was also spared the cane as he was above 50 years old at the time of sentencing.

In the aftermath of his trial, Khoo withdrew his appeal to the sentence; he, as described by his lawyer Mervyn Cheong, was remorseful for his actions.

Khoo is currently serving his life sentence at Changi Prison, until the end of his natural life. Khoo still faces the possibility of release on parole after a minimum of 20 years served.

== Aftermath ==
Leslie Khoo's case was the second case in Singapore's legal history where a person was convicted of murder in the absence of a body, after the case of Sunny Ang Soo Suan, a law student who was sentenced to death on 18 May 1965 for the 1963 murder of his barmaid girlfriend, Jenny Cheok Cheng Kid, during a scuba diving trip, solely based on circumstantial evidence and without the body. Ang was hanged on 6 February 1967 after he lost his appeals against the sentence. The case was also one of the iconic cases solved by the police using DNA and technology.

The case of Leslie Khoo was re-enacted in the 2020 season of Crimewatch as its fifth episode on 20 September 2020. A few details of the case were altered in the re-enactment for dramatic purposes (e.g. the victim Cui Yajie's name was changed to Chen Peipei; while Khoo still kept his name in the re-enactment).

Another crime show, in 2022, titled Inside Crime Scene, also adapted the Gardens By the Bay murder case and aired the on-screen adaptation as its fourth and penultimate episode.

== See also ==
- List of major crimes in Singapore
- Capital punishment in Singapore
- Life imprisonment in Singapore
- List of murder convictions without a body
- List of cases affected by the Kho Jabing case
