= Jurong fishing port murders =

1980 double murders at a Singapore fishing port

- 31-year-old Lee Cheng Tiong, the first victim of the murders
- Date: 2 November 1980
- Location: Jurong, Singapore
- Outcome: Beh found guilty of manslaughter and sentenced to life imprisonment and caning in 1984; Sim found guilty of murder and sentenced to death in 1985; The third man Chng Meng Joo remained at large
- Deaths: Lee Cheng Tiong (31); Teo Keng Siang (16)
- Injuries: None
- Convicted: Beh Meng Chai (20); Sim Min Teck (18)
- Verdict: Guilty (Sim and Beh)
- Convictions: Sim: Murder (two counts); Beh: Manslaughter (two counts); Beh: Armed robbery (two counts)
- Sentence: Sim: Death penalty Beh: Life imprisonment and caning of 24 strokes

On 2 November 1980, two people – 31-year-old fish dealer Lee Cheng Tiong (李正中 Lǐ Zhèngzhōng or 李清忠 Lǐ Qìngzhōng) and 16-year-old Teo Keng Siang (张庆祥 Zhāng Qìngxiáng) – were brutally murdered by one or more unknown assailants. The murders remained unsolved for two years before a suspect was finally nabbed in connection to the killings.

The suspect Beh Meng Chai (白明才 Bái Míngcái), who was Malaysian, confessed that a total of three people, including himself, were responsible for the murders and gave information about the identities of his two accomplices (who were also Malaysians), resulting in the arrest of Sim Min Teck (沈明德 Shěn Míngdé or 沈民德 Shěn Míndé; alias Ah Teck 阿德 A Dé), who was pointed out by Beh as the one who, together with the third accomplice Chng Meng Joo (庄明裕 Zhuāng Míngyù; alias Ah Yu 阿裕 A Yù), killed Teo and Lee.

In the subsequent court proceedings regarding the case, Beh was sentenced to life imprisonment and 24 strokes of the cane after the prosecution reduced the double murder charges to manslaughter in view of Beh's cooperation with the police and willingness to testify in the trial of Sim, who was found guilty of murder and sentenced to death in a separate trial. The third and final suspect Chng remains on the run for the Jurong fishing port murders.

== Murders ==
A childhood photo of the second victim Teo Keng Siang, taken at age 12.

On the morning of 2 November 1980, an 18-year-old fishery worker discovered his boss and another boy dead inside their company office at Jurong fishing port.

The deceased boss was Lee Cheng Tiong, a 31-year-old fish dealer, and the other victim was 16-year-old Teo Keng Siang, the employee of another fish dealer. It was established through the police investigations and witness accounts that Teo went to the office that day on his boss's request to pass some money in Malaysian currency to Lee, but it turned out that Lee and Teo were killed. It was also the normal practice for Lee and other fish dealers working in the area to exchange their foreign money out of their profits made from their respective fishery businesses. The police did not rule out robbery as a motive for the murder. The murders of Teo and Lee were the eighth case of murder to happen within the week itself, where seven were reported before the present case, and the police sent public appeals for information to solve these eight cases.

Teo's father (aged in his forties), who had one daughter aside from Teo, told the press that he was saddened over the death of his only son, who was the eldest of his two children. Teo's father stated that after his son dropped out of secondary school at age 13 due to his poor grades, he went to work in various jobs before Teo himself decided to join a fishery business as an employee, despite the objections by his father to be in this occupation, which Teo joined for only three weeks before his murder.

Professor Chao Tzee Cheng, the senior forensic pathologist, performed an autopsy on the victims. He stated in his autopsy report that there were a total of nine stab wounds on Lee's body, and two chest wounds were the main cause of Lee's death. Professor Chao also revealed there were four knife wounds on Teo's corpse, all of which directed at his chest and penetrated his right lung, and thus caused Teo to die. He also stated that there was a cut to Teo's left finger, suggesting that Teo had put up his left hand to defend himself against his attackers. Professor Chao determined that the murders of Teo and Lee were committed by at least two or more persons unknown, given the fact that both victims, who were both of tall and huge body build, had been brutally overpowered and killed within the small confinement of Lee's little fishery office.

== Arrests ==
On 5 April 1982, two years after the murders of Teo Keng Siang and Lee Cheng Tiong, the police finally had a breakthrough in their investigations, as they received information that a man suspected to be involved in the murders was residing in Singapore. Three days later, Inspector Yeo Bak Sek and his team of officers arrested the suspect, a 22-year-old Perak-born Malaysian named Beh Meng Chai, at his rented flat at Ho Ching Road. Beh was later charged with murder.

Upon his arrest, Beh confessed that he was involved in the case, but he stated he was not alone in the crime. He told police that he and his two Malaysian friends Chng Meng Joo (alias Ah Yu) and Sim Min Teck, with whom he grew up in the same kampong, went to Jurong fishing port to rob Lee, who used to be Beh's employer before he left to become a welder, and Beh also revealed that both Chng and Sim were hiding in Malaysia. With the crucial information they received, the Singapore Police Force sought help from the Malaysian authorities, and on 14 July 1983, the Royal Malaysia Police arrested one of the two fugitives, 20-year-old fisherman Sim Min Teck, at his hometown in Kuantan, Pahang. Sim was extradited back to Singapore on 23 July 1983, and he was charged with murder the same day he arrived back to Singapore.

== Trial of Beh Meng Chai ==
=== Reduction of murder charges and plea of guilt ===
On 8 October 1984, Beh first stood trial for killing the two victims at the Jurong fishing port. By then, after some representations from the defence, the prosecution decided to, out of strategic reasons, reduce the double murder charges to lower charges of culpable homicide not amounting to murder, which also meant manslaughter in Singapore legal terms. It was done on account that Beh fully cooperated with the police, and that he was willing to act as the prosecution's witness against Sim Min Teck in his upcoming trial for the two charges of murder. Beh pleaded guilty to two charges of manslaughter, and another two charges of armed robbery for stealing the money from both Lee and Teo after their deaths.

The prosecution, led by Glenn Knight (who formerly prosecuted infamous child killer Adrian Lim for murder), submitted that the maximum sentence of life imprisonment should be imposed for the most severe charge of manslaughter in Beh's case, and he also sought the maximum terms for the other two charges of armed robbery. Knight submitted that other than Beh's considerably smaller role in the killings and his willingness to testify against Sim, there were no other mitigating factors in the case, given that the killings were committed in an unusually brutal manner and cruelly executed in the course of robbery, and thus on account of his responsibility for the killings committed by the trio, Beh deserved the maximum punishments the law could impose in accordance to the offences he was convicted for.

=== Sentencing of Beh ===
On the same day Beh was convicted, the trial judge Lai Kew Chai delivered his verdict regarding Beh’s sentence. He stated in the judgement that while he accepted the defence lawyer M Puvanendram's mitigation plea that Beh did not stab the victims, his mere age of twenty at the time of the crime, his full cooperation with the police and his contribution to the arrest of the principal offender Sim, he nonetheless stated that the crimes were brutal and a harsh punishment should be imposed to reflect the gravity and severity of the offences. Justice Lai pointed out that based on Beh's confession, the other evidence and the common intention he shared with the two men to commit the fatal robberies, Beh would have been held guilty of murder in the eyes of law regardless of whether he took part in the stabbing or not. Justice Lai personally addressed to Beh that he was very fortunate that the charges of murder were reduced, such that he would not face the death penalty as a result of the prosecution's exercise of their prerogative to proceed with the amended charges.

As such, Justice Lai imposed the maximum term of life imprisonment with four strokes of the cane for each of the double charges of manslaughter, and the maximum term of ten years with ten strokes of the cane for each of the double armed robbery charges. In total, 24-year-old Beh Meng Chai received two life sentences and two ten-year sentences, as well as a total of 28 strokes of the cane. However, the judge ordered that Beh should serve all his four jail terms concurrently, and he noted that the law restricts a convict from receiving more than the maximum of 24 strokes in a single trial. As a result, Beh’s number of cane strokes was reduced from the original 28 strokes to 24 strokes, and he would only serve a single term of life imprisonment behind bars.

By the laws of Singapore back in 1984, life imprisonment was considered as a jail term of twenty years with the usual one-third remission for good behaviour, before the landmark appeal of Abdul Nasir Amer Hamsah on 20 August 1997 led to the definition of life imprisonment being changed to a sentence that lasts the remainder of the prisoner's natural life, with effect from the day after the appeal ruling.

== Trial of Sim Min Teck ==
=== Arguments against proceeding of murder charge ===
Sim Min Teck, who was 18 years old when he allegedly stabbed Teo and Lee during the brutal armed robberies

On 18 March 1985, 23-year-old Sim Min Teck stood trial for the double charges of murder for killing Teo Keng Siang and Lee Cheng Tiong. Defence lawyer Edwin Chan represented Sim as his lawyer, while Glenn Knight, who earlier prosecuted Beh Meng Chai for manslaughter, was assigned as the trial prosecutor of the case (with Jennifer Marie assisting him), and the two trial judges presiding the trial were L P Thean and Abdul Wahab Ghows. Sim pleaded not guilty to the charges of intentional murder at the start of his trial.

At the start of Sim's trial however, Sim's lawyer argued that the prosecution should not proceed with the original charges of murder against his client on the account that the key prosecution witness Beh Meng Chai had been convicted of manslaughter after the amendment of his original murder charges before trial, and that the trial judge had found Beh and the other accomplices in question had the common intention of committing the offences Beh was convicted of. However, the prosecution argued that the trial judge Lai Kew Chai had emphasized that the offence which was committed in furtherance of the trio's common intention was murder and although Beh was in the end convicted of manslaughter, his actions was also part of the offence of murder committed by one or more of them three robbers in question and there was no finding by the prosecution or judge that all the three men had committed manslaughter by common intention. The judges therefore overruled the defence's arguments and allowed the prosecution to proceed with the original murder charges against Sim for killing both Lee and Teo.

Also, Sim raised several allegations that his statements to the police were not made voluntarily, and later, these allegations were also dismissed by the judges, who both admitted the statements as evidence.

=== Beh's account ===
Beh came to court to testify against Sim, and his account of what happened was similar to the confession he made to the police and admitted statement of facts at his own trial. He testified that on the day of the murders, he and Sim and the missing third accomplice Chng Meng Joo had entered the fishing port office of the first victim Lee Cheng Tiong to rob him, and both Sim and Chng were inside the room with Lee while Beh himself stayed outside as a lookout. As the door was partially open, Beh witnessed Lee being stabbed multiple times by both Chng and Sim while he put up a struggle for his life. It happened so that at the moment Lee was killed, the second victim Teo Keng Siang arrived at the office with a hundred bucks in Malaysian ringgit, which he was supposed to pass to Lee on his boss's behalf. Although Beh asked his two accomplices to spare Teo's life, Sim mercilessly murdered the 16-year-old boy after he pulled him inside the room without hesitation.

Beh also said that after killing Teo and Lee, all three of them proceeded to search in the room for Lee's money, and they took about S$1,000 in total, and even stole Lee's pendant and gold chain. Beh added that they also took away Teo's Malaysian currency cash, and later, they sold Lee's chain and pendant for S$3,500, which were divided between themselves. Beh said that afterwards, all three of them ran off to Malaysia, staying in different places at Johor, Kuala Lumpur and Melaka. Beh also added he only returned to Singapore in April 1982 as he thought the police did not know of his involvement in the killings, which was proven wrong when he was arrested in the same month of his return to Singapore.

=== Sim's defence ===
Sim elected to give his defence. He stated that he never intended to kill the victims but only wanted to rob. He first touched on about the death of Lee, stating that after the trio entered Lee's office, Chng was the first to attack Lee, and they got embroiled into a fight. Sim said he saw Lee being stabbed many times by Chng, before he went in between the two men to break up the fight, but Lee, who disarmed Chng by then, charged at Sim with the knife despite being badly wounded, and so Sim himself stabbed Lee once in the abdomen in self-defense.

Sim also recounted that they encountered Teo, who just arrived and witnessed the murder of Lee. He stated that Teo blackmailed the trio and threatened to call the police to report the matter. Sim stated that out of panic, he stabbed Teo once in the stomach, but the rest of the stab wounds on Teo's body were caused by Chng and Beh, who all did so despite Sim's suggestion to spare the injured boy and tied him up here. Under the prosecution's cross-examination, Sim denied killing Lee when the victim tried to defend himself, and he denied that he killed Teo to silence him.

=== Closing submissions ===
The defence counsel of Sim made their closing submissions, arguing that Sim should be convicted of the same charges of manslaughter as Beh, on account that he and Beh were guilty of the same offence by common intention per the findings of Justice Lai Kew Chai during Beh's 1984 trial. Chan also stated that the prosecution's decision to charge Sim with murder while proceeding with manslaughter charges against Beh for the same case was a violation of Sim's right to equality and equal treatment under the law, and hence he sought a guilty verdict of manslaughter for his client. He also stated that Beh's testimony should not be trusted as evidence against Sim.

On the other hand, the trial prosecutor Glenn Knight argued that the reason why the prosecution reduced Beh's murder charges was based on the totality of evidence and his comparably smaller role in the case, and he stated the prosecution was legally bound with the prerogative to amend the charges against a defendant in a murder case where more than one person was charged, and it was not necessarily the case where an accomplice of a murder should be charged with murder, due to the different roles that all accomplices may play in such cases. The prosecution also emphasized that the trio's common intention, per Justice Lai's findings, was to commit murder (whether by one or more of them) during the course of committing aggravated robbery. Knight argued that the judgement of Beh's trial should not have any bearing in Sim's trial verdict, and that he pointed out Sim and the third accomplice Chng, as the aggressors, had brutally killed the first victim Lee Cheng Tiong after they forcibly entered the premises to rob him, which was not a classic case of self-defense. The murder of the second victim Teo Keng Siang, per Knight's arguments, was also not accidental, as there was a clear sign that the robbers did not want to leave him alive as a witness to identify them. Hence, Knight sought a guilty verdict of murder in Sim's case.

The verdict was scheduled to be given on 27 March 1985.

=== Verdict ===
On 27 March 1985, the two trial judges - Justice L P Thean and Justice Abdul Wahab Ghows - delivered their verdict.

In their 27-page verdict, which was read by Justice Abdul Wahab, the judges rejected Sim's claim of self-defence when killing Lee, and also stated that they disbelieved Sim's claim that he was not involved in the murder of Teo. They found that the victims had been ruthlessly stabbed with the intention of causing death, regardless of whoever took part in the stabbing. Justice Abdul Wahab also stated that the judges considered Beh as a truthful witness and accepted his testimony that Lee had been restrained and stabbed by both Sim and the third accomplice Chng Meng Joo, and it was clear that the murder of Lee was within the trio's calculations when they conspired to commit armed robbery. Justice Abdul Wahab also stated that the trio had killed 16-year-old Teo to facilitate their escape after the robbery, and that the young boy's murder was also conceived out of the trio's common intention to flee. Based on the above evidence, the judges disbelieved Sim's claim that he never expected the murders to happen in the course of robbery.

As such, the trial judges found 23-year-old Sim Min Teck guilty of the two original charges of murder for the deaths of 31-year-old Lee Cheng Tiong and 16-year-old Teo Keng Siang, and they sentenced Sim to death. Lee's brother and father, as well as Teo's family, were all present in court to hear the verdict and they applauded the verdict of death issued against Sim. A group of Chinese politicians, including members of the Chinese Ministry of Justice, also came to the courtroom to observe the trial proceedings of the courts of Singapore.

== Aftermath ==
=== Sim's appeal and execution ===
After the end of his trial and sentencing, Sim filed an appeal to the Court of Appeal against his sentence. He also argued that his right to equal treatment under the law had been breached, on account that he alone faced the original charges of murder in the same case as Beh, who faced lower charges of manslaughter. However, the three judges - Justice A. P. Rajah, Justice Lai Kew Chai (the former trial judge of Beh's case), and Chief Justice Wee Chong Jin - were aligned with the prosection's arguments, stating that the prosecution clearly summarized that the perpetrators of the Jurong fishing port murders shared the common intention to rob the victims and that murder, not manslaughter, was committed by one or more than one of them in furtherance of the same common intention itself, and they brought weapons to facilitate the commission of armed robbery and use of violence of necessary. On this finding of fact, all three of them could have been liable for murder.

The judges also emphasized that the prosecution only reduced the charges against Beh in a moment of "prerogative mercy" due to the uncertainty of whether he partaken in the stabbing of the victims and the extenuating circumstances of his case compared to Sim's. One of the judges, Justice Rajah, commented that it seemed that Sim was feeling aggrieved at the fact that he was convicted of murder, unlike Beh who faced manslaughter charges. The three judges also pointed out that the prosecution had the right to decide on which charge to proceed against the defendant, and the charges cannot speak for themselves on whether the defendant should be guilty of murder in light of the evidence available, since a person may not be charged with murder even in a case that was genuinely constituted as murder. As such, on 7 July 1986, the Court of Appeal ruled that the appeal of Sim should be dismissed, since there was no breach of his rights. After the loss of his appeal, Sim was eventually hanged at Changi Prison.

=== Legal effect of Sim's case ===
Even during the later years after the occurrence of the Jurong fishing port murders and Sim Min Teck's execution, the case of Sim's appeal was referred to from time to time in several other capital cases, where defendants were convicted of different charges in the same cases. For instance, in his 2011 lawsuit against the Attorney-General of Singapore, Ramalingam Ravinthran, a convicted drug trafficker sentenced to death for two charges of trafficking about 7kg of cannabis, appealed that there was a violation to his right to equality and equal protection under the law, given that both he and his accomplice Sundar Arujunan initially faced capital charges, but only Ramalingam himself was sentenced to death while Sundar was convicted of lower charges in the same case and received a twenty-year sentence with 24 strokes of the cane. In referencing to the case of both Sim and Beh Meng Chai, the courts dismissed the lawsuit on the grounds that the prosecution had the discretion to proceed with different charges based on the evidence and role of the defendants in the joint offence charged.

In another case, Malaysian drug trafficker Yong Vui Kong, who was nineteen when he was sentenced to death for the offence of importing 47g of heroin, filed a lawsuit against the Attorney General on the grounds that he had been discriminated in terms of the prosecution's discretion to charge him with capital drug trafficking while the mastermind Chia Choon Leng, who was instead detained without trial for allegedly instigating Yong to traffic drugs. In referring to the Sim Min Teck appeal case, the Court of Appeal dismissed Yong's appeal for the lack of merit in his case, given that there was insufficient evidence to charge and convict Chia for the bigger role he played in Yong's crime, and they stated that the different treatment Chia received has no bearing in Yong's conviction, since there was sufficient evidence to convict Yong, and the prosecution had the legal right to proceed with different charges against two or persons who played different roles in the same crime. In the aftermath, the government passed laws to allow drug couriers to no longer face the death penalty and receive life imprisonment instead, and allowed the chance for inmates on death row to seek an approval for re-sentencing. As a result, Yong successfully applied for his death sentence to be commuted to life imprisonment and 15 strokes of the cane.

In a 2001 drug case appeal, Thiruselvam Nagaratnam, a death row convict, argued that he was discriminated and subjected to unequal treatment since his accomplice Katheraven Gopal was convicted of reduced drug charges and sentenced to 25 years' imprisonment and 24 strokes of the cane. However the Court of Appeal, in upholding the principles laid by precedent cases including the appeal of Sim Min Teck, stated that there were overwhelming evidence against Thiruselvam to prove he played a larger role than Katheraven and thus it was fair for the prosecution to proceed with higher charges against him compared to Katheraven, and they rightly exercised their prerogative to proceed with different charges against the defendants charged in the same case for their respective roles in the crime.

It was also the case study behind the prosecution’s prerogative to pursue different charges for multiple defendants of a single case in a 2013 law school journal by the Singapore Management University's Yong Pung How School of Law.

=== Fates of Beh and Chng ===
Beh did not appeal his sentence, and he subsequently served his life term (equivalent to twenty years' jail) at Changi Prison. He was released in the present time and repatriated to Malaysia.

The third and final accomplice, Chng Meng Joo, remains on the run for the double murder charges of Teo Keng Siang and Lee Cheng Tiong.

== See also ==
- Caning in Singapore
- Life imprisonment in Singapore
- Capital punishment in Singapore
