= Murder of William Tiah Hung Wai =

2014 murder of a pimp in Geylang, Singapore

William Tiah Hung Wai
- Born: William Tiah Hung Wai; 22 January 1978; Singapore
- Died: 21 January 2014 (aged 35); Geylang, Singapore
- Cause of death: Fatal head injury
- Other name: William Kia
- Occupation: Pimp
- Known for: Murder victim

On 14 January 2014, inside his workplace in Geylang, 50-year-old brothel owner Chan Lie Sian (陈烈山 Chén Lìeshān), (Note: His Chinese name was also spelt as 陈来贤 Chén Láixián) alias Benny Seow, brutally assaulted his subordinate, 35-year-old William Tiah Hung Wai (程宏伟 Chéng Hóngwěi), over a sum of S$6,500 that was missing from his workplace, and he suspected that Tiah stole the money.

Tiah suffered head injuries and died in hospital a week later, and Chan, who was originally charged with causing grievous harm, had his charge amended to murder upon Tiah's death. Chan, who denied having the intent to cause death, was found guilty of premeditated murder and sentenced to hang in 2017.

Upon receiving Chan's appeal in 2019, the Court of Appeal accepted that Chan never intended to cause death even though they agreed that he had committed murder, and they also accepted that Chan did not exhibit a blatant disregard for human life or viciousness when he committed the crime, and hence they allowed Chan's appeal by finding him guilty of a lesser degree of murder and thus commuting Chan's death sentence to life in prison.

== Death of William Tiah ==
On 16 January 2014, a 50-year-old brothel owner named Chan Lie Sian surrendered himself to the police for seriously assaulting a pimp at his brothel two days before. According to Chan, who illegally operated his brothel in Geylang, he discovered that a sum of S$6,500 was missing from his workplace, and suspected that the victim, 35-year-old William Tiah Hung Wai, who was a fellow member of the same gang with Chan, had stolen it the night before, and he therefore contacted Tiah to meet up on that morning of 14 January. Although Tiah denied stealing the money, Chan raised a metal dumbbell rod to bludgeon Tiah on the head several times and even persisted in the attack after Tiah fell onto the bed and grew unconscious. The attack was witnessed by several people, and Chan verbally threatened to break Tiah's limbs if he did not die. Subsequently, an ambulance was called to bring Tiah to Tan Tock Seng Hospital; Chan initially lied to police that he found Tiah lying on the roadside before he surrendered two days after the attack. Tiah's case was classified as one of grievous hurt and Chan was charged on 18 January 2014 with causing grievous hurt to Tiah.

On 21 January 2014, a day short of his 36th birthday, William Tiah Hung Wai died in a coma. 50-year-old Chan, who was already in custody for voluntarily inflicting grievous hurt to Tiah, had his charge amended to murder, an offence which carried the death penalty in Singapore. A forensic pathologist, Dr Wee Keng Poh, certified that the cause of death was the skull fractures caused by Chan during the attack. Dr Wee verified that Tiah's head was struck at least eight times, and the force exerted with each blow was sufficient to cause multiple lacerations and extensive skull fractures.

== Trial of Chan Lie Sian ==
Chan Lie Sian
- Born: Chan Lie Sian; 1964 (age 61–62); Singapore, Malaysia
- Other name: Benny Seow
- Occupation: Brothel owner (former)
- Status: Imprisoned at Changi Prison since January 2014
- Conviction: Murder under Section 300(c) of the Penal Code (one count)
- Criminal charge: Murder under Section 300(a) of the Penal Code (one count)
- Penalty: Life imprisonment

On 28 February 2017, Chan Lie Sian stood trial for the murder of William Tiah. Chan was represented by Kelvin Lim, while the prosecution was led by Deputy Public Prosecutor (DPP) April Phang. The trial was presided over by Judicial Commissioner Hoo Sheau Peng. The charge of murder Chan faced came under Section 300(a) of the Penal Code, which dictates an offence of murder committed with a premeditated intent to cause death, and a conviction for such an offence would result in a mandatory sentence of death. For the other three clauses of murder under Sections 300(b), 300(c) and 300(d), they did not carry the prerequisite intent to kill and hence carried either the death sentence or life imprisonment with caning. Over 51 witnesses were called to testify in Chan's trial.

During the eight-day trial, Chan gave his account of the events that occurred before he attacked Tiah. While Chan did not deny attacking Tiah, his defence was that he had consumed both alcohol and cough syrup before the incident, and his state of mind was affected by intoxication of drugs and alcohol. He also claimed he only hit Chan twice on the head, and the blows were accidental. However, DPP Phang argued that based on the forensic report, Chan's attack was "vicious and relentless", which proved that he possessed the intention to kill Tiah for allegedly stealing his cash, and his guilt was corroborated by his acts of preventing other people from calling the ambulance, telling the bystanders to clean up the scene, and he disposed of the murder weapon, showing that Chan was meticulous in trying to cover up his crime and downplay his responsibility, and his mental state was not affected by drugs or alcohol at the time of the murder.

On 31 May 2017, Judicial Commissioner Hoo Sheau Peng delivered her verdict. She found that there was no sudden fight between Tiah and Chan, and the attack on Tiah was one-sided and vicious, since Tiah was unarmed and of smaller build. She also found that Chan had hit the victim's head at least nine times with the intention to cause death, and she did not accept his account that he had hit Tiah twice on the head. Judicial Commissioner Hoo also pointed out that even after Tiah fell unconscious, Chan continued to strike him and threatened in Hokkien that he would break his limbs if Tiah did not die, and his mental state of mind was also not affected by cough syrup and alcohol intoxication.

Hence, 53-year-old Chan Lie Sian was found guilty of murder under Section 300(a) of the Penal Code and sentenced to death.

== Chan's appeal ==
On 3 April 2019, Chan Lie Sian's appeal was heard at the Court of Appeal. While the prosecution argued that Chan's conviction for murdering William Tiah with intent to kill ought to be upheld, Chan's lawyer Wendell Wong argued that there was no specific intention on Chan's part to cause death, as he only attacked Tiah to teach him a lesson over the missing money, and some of his blows were not aiming at the head but on other parts of the body, and only one of the blows was fatal; hence his conviction should be reduced to voluntarily causing grievous hurt, which may carry a sentence of up to 15 years' jail with caning. Alternatively, Chan's lawyer argued that even if his client was indeed guilty of murder, he should not be convicted under Section 300(a) but under Section 300(c) of the Penal Code, which dictates a lesser offence of murder by intentionally inflicting bodily injuries that were sufficient in the ordinary course of nature to cause death, and his sentence should be the minimum sentence of life imprisonment instead of death, on the grounds that the attack was not sufficiently vicious to warrant the harsher sentence of death, and Chan himself did not know that the hurt he caused would lead to death, and even helped put a bandage on despite delaying medical attention. Judgement was reserved by the Court of Appeal on the same day of Chan's appeal hearing.

On 30 July 2019, Chief Justice Sundaresh Menon, and Judges of Appeal Andrew Phang and Judith Prakash, who heard Chan's appeal, delivered their verdict. After due consideration, the three judges found that the trial judge Hoo Sheau Peng had erred in convicting Chan of murder under Section 300(a) of the Penal Code, and they accepted that there was no intention on Chan's part to cause death, since the medical evidence showed that some of the injuries were not caused by Chan but by "interventing objects." Furthermore, there was ample opportunity for Chan to act on his intent to cause death, specifically when there were no witnesses and the victim was helpless on the bed, but Chan did not do so. Also, Chan's lack of intent to cause death was corroborated by his act of throwing water on Tiah's face to attempt to revive him, and threatened to further attack the victim once he woke up under the eyes of a witness. They noted that Chan surrendered himself to the police and expected to be charged with causing grievous hurt, and genuinely thought that the harm caused was not fatal.

Therefore, the Court of Appeal re-convicted Chan of murder under Section 300(c) of the Penal Code, since he had intentionally caused bodily injuries that were sufficient to cause death in the ordinary course of nature, and it was also considered an act of murder but with no intent to kill. In relation to Chan's sentence, the appellate court said the death sentence was not warranted as Chan had not acted in a manner that displayed blatant disregard for human life, and he was not as vicious as the offender in the precedent case of Kho Jabing, which stated that the death penalty for murder with no intent to kill should be reserved for the exceptional cases of murder that sparked an outrage of the community's feelings and demonstrated an offender's viciousness and/or a blatant disregard for human life. They cited the same reason that Chan was not aware of the fatality of the injuries, and that Chan's attack lasted for only 15 minutes and not for a prolonged period of time, he never took additional actions to make the victim suffer, and his refusal to seek immediate treatment for Tiah was at most, a disregard for the welfare of Tiah rather than that of human life.

As such, they commuted Chan's death sentence to life imprisonment, enabling Chan to be spared the death penalty for murdering Tiah. No caning was imposed due to Chan's age of 55 at the time of the conclusion of his appeal process. Chan is currently imprisoned at Changi Prison since January 2014.

== Aftermath ==
The appeal ruling of Chan Lie Sian's case influenced the sentencing guidelines for murder in Singapore, which inherited certain guidelines first coined by the landmark case of Kho Jabing (as well as Chia Kee Chen). It affirmed that for cases of murder with no intention to kill, the death penalty should only be imposed in such cases if the actions of the offender outrage the feelings of the community, such as by exhibiting viciousness or a blatant disregard for human life, and it also touched on the factors relevant to determine the extent of the offender's conduct at the time of the murder, including the number of stabs or blows inflicted, the area of injury, the duration of the attack, the force used, the mental state of the offender, and the offender's actual role or participation in the attack.

For instance, in 2021, Chan's case was referenced to by High Court judge Valerie Thean, who sentenced a former Indonesian maid Daryati to life imprisonment for murdering her employer. Justice Thean found that in comparison to the circumstances of Chan's case, Daryati's conduct was not sufficiently abhorrent and callous to call for the imposition of the maximum punishment of death, which the prosecution did not seek during her trial. Justice Thean noted that the murder of Daryati's employer was not "cold and calculated", and her desperation to return home and trauma of being raped by her brother was sufficient to sentence Daryati to serve a life sentence instead of death.

== See also ==
- Capital punishment in Singapore
- Life imprisonment in Singapore
- List of major crimes in Singapore
- List of cases affected by the Kho Jabing case
