= Murder of Ho Kien Leong =

2005 murder of a businessman in Singapore

Ho Kien Leong
- Born: Ho Kien Leong; 28 February 1968; Singapore
- Died: 13 September 2005 (aged 37); Indus Road, Bukit Merah, Singapore
- Cause of death: Multiple stab wounds to the thorax
- Other names: Jayson Ho; Ho Kian Leong
- Occupations: Teacher (former); Businessman
- Known for: Murder victim

On 22 September 2005, 37-year-old film-maker Ho Kien Leong (Chinese: 何健良; Pe̍h-ōe-jī: Hô Kiān-liông; pinyin: Hé Jiànliáng), alias Jayson Ho, was found dead inside his flat at Indus Road, Bukit Merah, and he was certified to have been stabbed to death around nine days before his highly decomposed corpse was found. Ho's killer, Lim Ah Liang (Chinese: 林亚亮; Pe̍h-ōe-jī: Lîm A-liōng; pinyin: Lín Yàliàng), was arrested in Johor, Malaysia, where he was in hiding after he had killed Ho by stabbing him 13 times during an argument, and Lim was extradited back to Singapore to be investigated for killing Ho. Originally charged with murder, Lim, who suffered from depression at the time of the murder, was found guilty of manslaughter and sentenced to life imprisonment on 17 January 2007. Lim later lost his appeal for a lower jail term and is currently in prison serving his life sentence since 2005.

== Murder and investigations ==
On 22 September 2005, residents of a HDB block at Indus Road reported to the police about a very bad smell that came from one of the flats inside the block itself. The police arrived at the scene, and they managed to forcibly open the locked door of the flat. Upon their entry into the flat, a highly decomposed body of a man was found lying on the floor. Many neighbours were shocked to hear the discovery for they presumed there was a dead animal inside that led to the smell.

The deceased was identified as 37-year-old Ho Kien Leong, a former teacher who operated a massage business, and his death was classified as murder. Ho was the only child and son of his parents, who were devastated to hear the death of their son. Ho's father described him as a filial son who would provide them living expenses, and his mother said that Ho was thrifty in spending money. When Ho's corpse was found, he sustained head injuries and several stab wounds on his body, and the corpse was also infested with maggots, and his valuables were also missing from the house, including Ho's electronic safe, Ho's ATM cards and two identity cards belonging to Ho and a Lee Yean Shan. The police therefore deduced that the possible motive was robbery. Dr Lai Siang Hui, a forensic pathologist, certified that there were 13 stab wounds on Ho's body, and she stated that the cause of death was due to multiple stab wounds to Ho's thorax. There were no signs of forced entry into the flat, which gave credence to the police's theory that the killer was someone known to Ho. An eyewitness stated that he last saw a man with long hair stepping out of Ho's flat, and the person was often seen going in and out of the flat. There were also signs that a struggle also took place. Ho's flat was also cordoned for eight hours during their search for evidence.

Eventually, the police found that based on the phone records of Ho's mobile phone, only one number was dialed frequently, and it belonged to a 25-year-old Chinese national named Gu Chen Lin, and the stolen items from Ho's flat were discovered in Gu's possession. After his arrest for allegedly receiving stolen property, Gu told police that he was given the items by a friend named "Alex", who asked him to sell the identity cards for money, pry open the safe, and use the ATM cards and credit cards to withdraw cash and make purchases. "Alex", whose real name was Lim Ah Liang, was later found to have left Singapore on 16 September 2005 through the Woodlands Checkpoint.

Subsequently, after gaining intel from another friend of Lim that Lim was hiding in the Malaysian state of Johor, officers of the Singapore Police Force sought help from the Royal Malaysia Police, and on 23 September 2005, just 26 hours after the discovery of Ho's corpse, 27-year-old Lim Ah Liang was arrested at a hotel in Johor Bahru.

Lim was extradited back to Singapore on the same day of his arrest, and he was officially charged with murder. Should he be found guilty under Section 302 of the Penal Code, Lim Ah Liang would face the death penalty for murdering Ho Kien Leong. Lim, who was described to have golden long hair and slim-looking, reportedly was trying to avoid the reporters and kept his hair down. Some of Ho's neighbours reportedly told the press that they never seen Lim before, but one female neighbour said that she mistook Lim for a woman due to his long hair, and some also noted Lim often came to Ho's flat regularly. Ho's parents also said their son was living with the suspect, whom Ho said was his former classmate from a polytechnic.

Lim later returned to court in November 2005 for further preliminary hearings. Due to the recent arrests of suspected murderers who were very young and around their twenties, the public was concerned that more and more youngsters were arrested for serious crimes.

== Background of Lim Ah Liang ==
=== Early life ===
Born on 2 March 1978, Lim Ah Liang was the only child of his mother Lim Chuan Poh and an unnamed biological father. Lim was born an illegitimate child, and his biological parents never married, and he was fostered out at four months old before he turned seven and returned to live with both his mother and stepfather. Lim dropped out of primary school at age 11 due to relentless bullying due to him being branded an illegitimate child, and thus he helped his mother at her hawker stall. Lim was also a victim of child abuse by his foster family, and he was also being raped by an adult male during his childhood.

Prior to the murder of Ho Kien Leong, Lim had several run-ins with the law. In 1998, Lim was convicted of at least ten charges of theft and jailed until November 1999. Lim also served time in prison a second time from August 2001 until August 2003 for another spate of theft offences. During his time in National Service, Lim had gone AWOL for several times and also committed theft, and he was thus detained in the army detention barracks from August 2003 to September 2004.

After his completion of National Service, Lim often could not find stable work due to his criminal record and lack of education, and he had been prostituting himself and also provided massage services to sustain his living. He also began working under Ho Kien Leong, providing massage services to male customers and would also pay Ho a commission of S$14 out of the fee Lim received from each customer, which could range between S$50 and S$80; Lim was also homosexual and shared a relationship with Ho, who was also homosexual, although Ho's mother told the press that her son was not homosexual.

=== Lim's account ===
According to Lim, at around June 2005, he and Ho fell out with each other after Ho insisted on increasing his commission of S$14 to S$20, and Lim refused to do so as he needed money to supplement his meagre income. Three months later, on 13 September 2005, the date of Ho's murder, Lim went to Ho's flat to re-negotiate with Ho about the commission, but as they talked more and more, the conversation grew heated and Ho accused Lim for being unfaithful and was working for another agent, which Lim denied vehemently.

During the quarrel, based on Lim's account, Ho suddenly brandished a knife and threatened Lim, and demanded that Lim admit to his "infidelity". This led to a struggle for the knife, and Lim was able to gain possession of it and stabbed Ho on the chest. Ho tried to escape from the flat but Lim caught up to him at the door and stabbed him on the back a few times, before Ho rushed to the kitchen, where Lim got entangled with a struggle with Ho while assaulting him. Lim subsequently picked up a metal frame lying nearby and used it to bludgeon Ho on the head repeatedly, until Ho grew motionless. In total, Ho had sustained 13 stab wounds and also sustained head injuries.

After murdering Ho, Lim cleaned himself up and changed into a fresh set of clothes. He disposed of his bloodstained clothes and the knife in the rubbish chute, and also stole the two handphones, safe, wallet and a set of house keys from Ho's flat. Afterwards, he entrusted his friend Gu Chen Lin to help him sell the stolen items for money, and fled to Malaysia, before he was finally arrested.

== Trial and sentencing ==
Lim Ah Liang
- Born: Lim Ah Liang; 2 March 1978 (age 48); Singapore
- Other name: Alex
- Occupation: Prostitute (former)
- Parent: Lim Chuan Poh (mother)
- Status: Released on parole since September 2025
- Conviction: Manslaughter (one count)
- Criminal charges: Murder (one count)
- Penalty: Life imprisonment

On 17 January 2007, 28-year-old Lim Ah Liang stood trial at the High Court for the fatal stabbing of Ho Kien Leong back in 2005, and he was represented by Anand Nalachandran during the trial, which was presided by Justice V K Rajah. By then, Lim's murder charge was reduced to one of culpable homicide not amounting to murder, also known as manslaughter in Singaporean legal terms, on the grounds of diminished responsibility in September 2006. The crime of manslaughter was punishable by either a jail term of up to ten years, or life imprisonment, with the offender additionally liable to caning or a fine.

Dr Tommy Tan, a psychiatrist who assessed Lim, found that Lim was suffering from depression at the time of the murder, and it substantially impaired his state of mind at the time of the murder, and this qualified him for a defence of diminished responsibility and convinced the prosecution to reduce the murder charge. Furthermore, Dr Tan diagnosed Lim with dysthymia, a chronic form of depression and it led to a moderate depressive episode that caused Lim to react impulsively to Ho's threat at the time of the killing, and he also exhibited symptoms of loss of appetite, loss of weight, depressed mood, tearfulness and forgetfulness. Dr Tan also certified that due to Lim's abusive and violent childhood, his trauma of being raped in the past, and other emotional scars, it led to Lim suffering from depression and based on Dr Tan's opinion, Lim would have a relapse and had a high risk of re-offending, as attributed to weak familial support, lack of education and marketable skills, and his criminal history, and the severity of Lim's condition was so much so that he might need to depend on medication for life.

After Lim pleaded guilty to the manslaughter charge, the prosecution, led by Shahla Iqbal and Kenneth Chuah, argued that Lim should be jailed for life, the maximum punishment stipulated for manslaughter. They argued that Lim should be kept in a controlled environment for a long period of time to ensure that he adhered to his medication, citing Dr Tan's testimony that Lim might pose a danger to himself and others once he stopped his medication, and his psychiatric condition would undergo a relapse that might cause Lim to re-offend. They also cited that Lim did not have a secure and supportive social and family network, his inability to find a proper and legitimate job and possessed a high risk of re-offending, which were factors that should warrant a lengthy stay behind bars.

The defence argued in mitigation that Lim's sentence should be ten years as dysthmia did not normally led to people exhibiting violent behaviour, and Lim's actions of stabbing Ho to death was only out of impulse as induced by the abnormality of the mind, and they also cited that Lim was fully cooperative with the authorities during the investigations. The defence also argued that Lim concealed the evidence of his presence at the scene of the crime out of desperation and panic after finding out that Ho had died and he stole the safe not out of greed, but only out of fear that it contained records of the customers he serviced, and it might potentially identify him as a suspect, and his financial woes and need for money to flee the country was what drove Lim to ask his friends to sell the stolen items. Hence, they asked that Lim should not be given a life term as what the prosecution pushed for.

On the same date, Justice Rajah delivered his verdict on Lim's sentence. In his judgement, the judge stated that based on the psychiatric report, Lim's condition was extremely severe and required lifelong treatment, and there were chances that Lim would not adhere to his treatment while unsupervised, and he noted that Lim was not highly educated and had no marketable skills, had weak familial or social support and also violated the law several times, and Lim also could not find stable employment and made a living by prostitution, and hence his chances of re-offending was fairly high. He also noted that the condition did not deprive Lim of the ability to differentiate between right and wrong. Also drawing attention to the deplorable conduct of Lim when he remorselessly stabbed Ho to death with utter violence and brutality, Justice Rajah aligned himself with the prosecution and stated that it was more beneficial for Lim to be kept behind bars for the longest period permissible under the law, in order to protect society and safeguard Lim's own safety. Even so, Justice Rajah expressed his sympathy for Lim due to the unhappy childhood and trauma of rape which Lim underwent. Therefore, 28-year-old Lim Ah Liang was sentenced to life in prison by Justice Rajah.

With pursuant to the landmark ruling of Abdul Nasir Amer Hamsah's appeal on 20 August 1997, an offender sentenced to life imprisonment must remain behind bars for the rest of his or her natural life. This deviated from the previous law where it decreed that a life term was equivalent to a fixed jail term of twenty years. The legal change was applicable to criminal cases that were committed after 20 August 1997. Since the killing of Ho Kien Leong occurred on 13 September 2005, eight years and one month after the legal reform, Lim was to be imprisoned for the remainder of his natural life under the present life imprisonment laws.

== Lim's appeal ==
On 20 August 2007, seven months after Lim Ah Liang's sentencing, the Court of Appeal heard the appeal against Lim's sentence. Lim's lawyer Anand Nalachandran argued in court that Lim's sentence of life should be lowered to ten years' jail, as Lim's condition was improving with consistent treatment in prison, and he also highlighted that Lim's family and close friends would be able to take care of him upon his release, and hence it would be sufficient to order Lim to serve ten years behind bars since he could recover and rejoin society within that period.

However, in spite of the defence's above arguments, the two prison psychiatrists, who periodically assessed Lim in prison, testified that based on Lim's condition, it was premature for Lim to be released within ten years and an efficient post-release "treatment plan" cannot be drawn up to address Lim's condition should he be sentenced to ten years, and the prosecutor Christina Koh argued that a life sentence was more appropriate for Lim to protect both Lim and the society, and she pointed out that Lim's family was financially unable to take care of him and Lim could outlive both parents. Hearing both sides, the appellate court's three judges - Justice Kan Ting Chiu, Justice Andrew Phang and Justice Tay Yong Kwang - ruled in favour of the prosecution and dismissed the appeal. Lim's mother was reportedly saddened to hear the outcome.

Lim is currently at Changi Prison serving his life sentence since September 2005. Although Lim would be imprisoned for the remainder of his whole life, his sentence still carried the possibility of parole after a minimum period of 20 years, provided that he maintained good behaviour and was assessed suitable for release in 2025.

== Aftermath ==
=== Death of Lim's mother ===
In May 2012, Lim's mother Lim Chuan Poh died at the age of 60, after she reportedly collapsed outside her home while on her way to see her son in prison. Lim, then 33 years old, was granted an hour of leave from his sentence and temporarily released from Changi Prison to attend his mother's funeral wake. Lim was said to have turned to Buddhism while in prison, and Lim's stepfather also stated he was planning to have his partner's corpse cremated and her ashes be scattered in the sea, as he could not afford to buy a niche since he was old and may not be able to continue visit her once he die, and his stepson was in prison and would not visit her niche. Lim's mother was said to have loved her son a lot, and she saved up to hire a good lawyer to represent her son in court, and Lim himself also provided diligently to his mother some living expenses despite his financial difficulties.

=== In the media ===
In April 2011, Singaporean crime show Crimewatch re-enacted the murder of Ho Kien Leong, and it depicted the investigations that led to the arrest and conviction of Lim Ah Liang. Aside from Lim's conviction, the episode also revealed that Lim's friend Gu Chen Lin, who was charged for receiving stolen property from Lim and for consuming a controlled drug, had received a jail term of 16 months for his role in the case.

In June 2022, local writer Foo Siang Luen wrote the second volume of his real-life crime book Justice Is Done, which was published by the Singapore Police Force (including a digital download-for-free e-book version) 17 years after Foo wrote the first volume. The book recorded some of the gruesome murder cases encountered and solved by police throughout the years between 2005 and 2016, and the 2005 case of Ho Kien Leong's death was recorded as one of these cases covered in the book.

== See also ==
- Life imprisonment in Singapore
- List of major crimes in Singapore
