= Life imprisonment in Singapore =

National instance of life imprisonment as a penalty

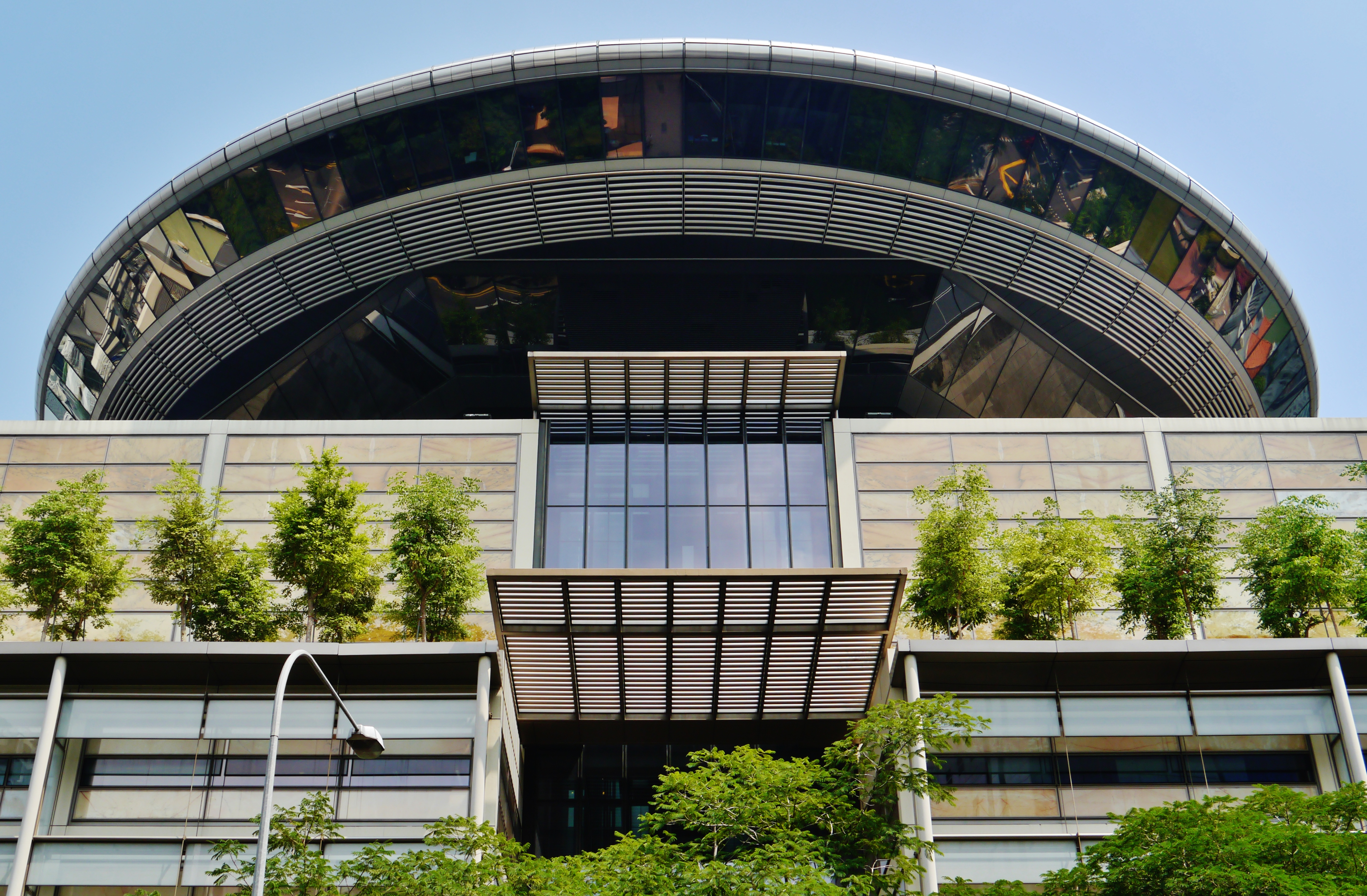
The Supreme Court of Singapore, where all suspects in Singapore face trial for crimes that attract life imprisonment

Life imprisonment is a legal penalty in Singapore. This sentence is applicable for more than forty offences under Singapore law (including the Penal Code, the Kidnapping Act and Arms Offences Act), such as culpable homicide not amounting to murder, attempted murder (if hurt was caused), kidnapping by ransom, criminal breach of trust by a public servant, voluntarily causing grievous hurt with dangerous weapons, and trafficking of firearms, in addition to caning or a fine for certain offences that warrant life imprisonment.

From 1 January 2013 onwards, the amendments to the death penalty laws in Singapore allow judges to impose life imprisonment as the lowest punishment for capital drug trafficking and murder with no intention to kill, under certain conditions for eligibility. Despite the legal changes and increasing cases of life imprisonment for murder and drug crimes, Law Minister K. Shanmugam revealed in 2020 that through two public surveys on Singaporeans and non-Singaporeans, more than 80% of both groups responded that the death penalty is more effective than life imprisonment as a deterrent towards capital offences.

Since 20 August 1997, after the landmark appeal of Abdul Nasir Amer Hamsah, the definition of life imprisonment is changed to mean a term of incarceration for the rest of a convict's natural lifespan, although it carries a possibility of release on parole after a minimum period of 20 years behind bars based on the prisoner's conduct.

The most recent case of life imprisonment in Singapore was Huang Bocan, a Singaporean convicted of torturing and murdering his younger sister in 2021, and sentenced to life on 5 November 2026.

== History ==
=== Origins and original definition of life imprisonment ===
Since the British colonial period of Singapore, the laws of Singapore was enacted based on the laws of England, and life imprisonment was thus included as one of the legal penalties allowed for certain offences in Singapore, even after its independence from British colonial rule. In the past, the laws of Singapore decreed that life imprisonment was a fixed sentence of 20 years with the possibility of one-third remission of the sentence (13 years and 4 months) for good behaviour. This definition was recognised by the Court of Appeal in the judgement of Neo Man Lee, a schizophrenic killer who received a life term in 1989 for the 1984 case of culpable homicide of Judy Quek.

Extracted from Neo Man Lee v Public Prosecutor (1991):

We were of the opinion that the conditions for sentence to imprisonment for life were clearly satisfied in the present case and justified a life sentence. The appellant (Neo Man Lee) is clearly a continuing danger not only to himself but also to the public. The trial judge was of the view, which we shared, that he should be detained as long as it was permissible under the law. We might add that, with remissions, life imprisonment in Singapore may be reduced in practice to no more than 14 years, and the appellant may in fact be out of prison in another seven years.

In June 1993, a question over the definition of life imprisonment was raised during the trial of Tan Swee Hoon, who was one of the two perpetrators responsible for the 1985 murder of an Indonesian fish merchant Nurdin Nguan Song. After Tan, who was arrested for another crime in 1992, pleaded guilty to manslaughter and unrelated armed robbery charges, the prosecution argued that Tan should be sentenced to the maximum penalty of life imprisonment, and in response, Tan's defence counsel Michael Teo and Liew Chen Mine argued that Tan should not be jailed for the rest of his natural life and it would be unfair to have the other jail terms for armed robbery to run consecutively with a life sentence for manslaughter, and this led to the trial court inquiring the prosecution about whether life imprisonment was supposed to be a jail term of 20 years or the remainder of one's natural life. However, the prosecution did not reply, and instead, they changed their request for Tan to serve 20 years' preventive detention. In the end, 41-year-old Tan was sentenced to 23 years in prison and 24 strokes of the cane. On the other hand, Tan's accomplice Loh Yoon Seong was caught in 1988, and he was found guilty of murder and sentenced to death in 1990, Loh lost his appeal in 1991, and his execution was carried out on an unknown date after the end of Tan's trial.

Since then, the definition of life imprisonment was still considered as a jail term of 20 years, but it would eventually be amended with effect from 20 August 1997 due to a landmark appeal that significantly raised the question behind the meaning of life imprisonment.

=== Change of definition from "life" to "natural life" ===
On 20 August 1997, Abdul Nasir bin Amer Hamsah, a Singaporean who received a life sentence (20 years) for the kidnapping of two policemen and a consecutive 18-year sentence for a separate case of robbery with hurt, submitted an appeal for the two sentences to run concurrently, which would mean he only need to serve 20 years in jail rather than 38 years (with the two terms served consecutively) if successful. But the Court of Appeal dismissed Abdul Nasir's appeal and ordered that he be serving 38 years in jail like the trial judge ordered. However, the three-judge panel, led by Chief Justice Yong Pung How, decide that it would be wrong to consider life imprisonment as a fixed jail term of 20 years and thus changed the definition of life imprisonment to a term of imprisonment for the prisoner's remaining lifespan. The amended definition is thus retroactively applied to future crimes committed after 20 August 1997. Since Abdul Nasir was already sentenced prior to this appeal verdict, his life sentence remained as a 20-year jail term under the previous law's definition.

The appeal of Abdul Nasir, titled "Abdul Nasir bin Amer Hamsah v Public Prosecutor [1997] SGCA 38", was since regarded as a landmark in Singapore's legal history as it changed the definition of life imprisonment from "life" to "natural life" under the law. It also affected the future cases of life imprisonment that occurred after 20 August 1997, where criminals like Sundarti Supriyanto, Tony Anak Imba, Leslie Khoo Kwee Hock and Yong Vui Kong were sentenced to the current version of natural life imprisonment instead of the old "20 years" version of life imprisonment.

The ruling of Abdul Nasir's appeal, however, did not affect any outstanding cases that happened before the 1997 changes to the law, and the old life imprisonment laws is still applicable for these cases, where the offender would not be imprisoned for life but for at most twenty years. In the case of wanted gunman Chin Sheong Hon, who was arrested in 2013 for using a revolver to rob and hurt a woman back in November 1981, the trial judge Pang Khang Chau highlighted that life imprisonment, as the maximum penalty for Chin's crime, should not be a term that lasts the remainder of his natural life but a term of twenty years' jail under the old laws before Abdul Nasir's case, since his crime was committed in 1981 while the previous laws were still in effect back then. 72-year-old Chin, in the end, was sentenced to 18 years' imprisonment in November 2022 despite the prosecution's submissions for a life sentence.

=== Introduction of life imprisonment for murder and drug trafficking ===
On 1 January 2013, the government of Singapore approved the changes to the death penalty laws, in which they introduced life imprisonment as the minimum punishment for murder offences with no intention to kill and capital drug trafficking, under certain conditions. For offenders who commit murder but had no intention to kill, they would receive life sentences with caning. This discretion is similarly applied to those convicted of drug trafficking, provided that they only act as couriers, suffering from impaired mental responsibility (e.g. depression), and/or substantively assisting the authorities in disrupting drug-related activities. Drug traffickers who were suffering from diminished responsibility will serve a mandatory life sentence without caning for their crimes, while those who acted as couriers would receive life terms and caning of not less than 15 strokes.

Minister for Law K. Shanmugam stated that these changes were a right step taken in view of the extremely low crime rate and increasing rate of public safety in Singapore, and such changes were made to allow judges to have more discretion in deciding between death and life in capital cases where their individual circumstances did not sufficiently call for the death penalty, which allowed more emphasis on mercy during sentencing while maintaining the need for retribution and deterrence. Shanmugam also quoted in his own words, "Justice can be tempered with mercy and, where appropriate, offenders should be given a second chance".

These legal reforms allowed offenders in some capital cases to be sentenced to life imprisonment instead of death, and it also allowed some death row inmates (notably Cheong Chun Yin and Yong Vui Kong) to be given the chance to undergo re-sentencing and had their sentences commuted to life. There were also subsequent cases, notably the case of Kho Jabing, that coined the main sentencing guidelines for murder, where it specified the required factors for judges to consider before imposing either the death penalty or life imprisonment, and it influenced the judgements of several murder cases like Micheal Anak Garing, Boh Soon Ho, Leslie Khoo Kwee Hock, Chia Kee Chen and Azlin Arujunah.

== Landmark rulings relating to life imprisonment ==
=== Sia Ah Kew and Others v Public Prosecutor (1974) ===
On 14 March 1972, five men – Sia Ah Kew, Ho Kok Keng, Hoong Khung Cheong, Koo Ah Choo and Lim Chai Thiam – were involved in the kidnapping of Tjioe Kok Hwie, an affluent Indonesian businessman and they demanded from Tjioe's daughters and wife a ransom of S$50,000. The five kidnappers were later arrested and sentenced to death by two High Court judges Choor Singh and D. C. D'Cotta on charges of kidnapping by ransom, a crime which attracts either a death sentence or life imprisonment with/without caning under the Kidnapping Act.

After the end of their trial proceedings in October 1973, the five kidnappers filed their appeals for their death sentences to be reduced, and on 2 April 1974, the Court of Appeal, having duly considered the facts, decided to reduce the death sentences to life imprisonment for the kidnappers. In addition to their life sentences, the five men also received caning: out of the five, Ho received the highest number of 12 strokes of the cane, Hoong received nine while the remaining three were caned six strokes.

In their ruling, the three-judge panel, consisting of Wee Chong Jin, Frederick Arthur Chua and T. Kulasekaram, stated that despite the kidnappers being armed with pistols and daggers and had threatened Tjioe and his family, they did not cause physical harm to Tjioe and they treated him well while he was confined by the kidnappers. The judges were of the view that the death penalty should strictly be reserved for the worst cases of kidnapping and in cases where the circumstances did not signal an anxious need for capital punishment or spark an outrage of the community's feelings, life imprisonment (whether with caning or not) should be the default sentence for those convicted of kidnapping by ransom.

Extracted from Sia Ah Kew and Others v Public Prosecutor [1974]:

In our opinion the maximum sentence prescribed by the legislature would be appropriate where the manner of the kidnapping or the acts or conduct of the kidnappers are such as to outrage the feelings of the community.

In the aftermath of the case, there were only five cases of kidnapping by ransom that took place between 1999 and 2014, though all cases ended with the courts issuing verdicts of life imprisonment based on the benchmark ruling and principles set by the Sia Ah Kew case, since all cases did not involve any serious harm caused to the victims. The rarity of kidnapping in Singapore was due to the tough laws and use of capital punishment in Singapore for the crime, and it was known to be an effective deterrent, resulting in kidnapping crimes being rarely committed in Singapore, as well as the judges' preference to sentence kidnappers to life in prison rather than death due to lack of aggravating circumstances that called for the death penalty.

=== Lim Hock Hin Kelvin v Public Prosecutor (1997) ===
In November 1996, 28-year-old cleaning supervisor Kelvin Lim Hock Hin was arrested by the police for allegations of sexual assault of five young boys between ages nine and 13, of which two of the victims were his godsons. He was investigated to have used offers of free tuition and toys to lure his victims and gain their trust before performing anal and oral sex on them. Prior to his arrest, Lim was convicted twice in 1988 and 1993 for sexual offences against young boys; his first sentence was 15 months' jail and the second was 32 months, and he was just released for less than four months before he re-offended. As Lim, who pleaded guilty to ten out of 40 charges of unnatural sex with a minor, was diagnosed with chronic paedophilia, a psychological sexual disorder where there is a sexual preference in young children, and Lim also had a high risk of re-offending, which persuaded Justice T. S. Sinnathuray to sentence Lim to a total of 40 years' imprisonment (consisting of four consecutive terms of ten years each) on 29 August 1997, to isolate him from society out of protection as long as possible. In fact, under the law back in 1997 before its eventual repeal, Section 377 of the Penal Code (the 1985 edition) decreed that a charge of unnatural sex with a minor carries the maximum sentence of life imprisonment, a sentence which Lim evaded.

In November 1997, in dismissing Kelvin Lim's appeal, the Court of Appeal's three judges – consisting of Chief Justice Yong Pung How, Judges of Appeal Thean Lip Ping (L P Thean) and M Karthigesu – took into consideration Lim's refusal of medical treatment, lack of familial support and the great danger he posed to society given his paedophilic condition, they decided to not reduce his 40-year sentence.

Extracted from Lim Hock Hin Kelvin v Public Prosecutor [1997]:

There were no significant mitigating factors in this case. The learned judge (Sinnathuray) had found, rightly in our opinion, that paedophilia is not a disease or a physical illness but is a disorder. … Even if paedophilia is an illness, we reject any suggestion that the sufferer cannot help it and therefore carries only a diminished responsibility for his actions. There is no evidence that paedophiles cannot exercise a high degree of responsibility and self-control. The learned judge found that the appellant (Lim) had a choice of whether to commit paedophilic offences against the victims, and chose to do so.

The three judges also made a benchmark ruling, which decreed that in whichever future cases, if a chronic paedophile was unable to or see no initiative to refrain himself from his sexual advances towards children, such offenders should be sentenced to the maximum penalty of life imprisonment. This legal benchmark, however, did not retroactively apply to Lim's case since he was sentenced before the date of his appeal's ruling.

=== Public Prosecutor v Tan Kei Loon Allan (1998) ===
In August 1998, Allan Tan Kei Loon, an 18-year-old gang member who killed a rival gang member Png Hock Seng during a street gang attack, was found guilty of culpable homicide not amounting to murder by the High Court, and the trial judge Tay Yong Kwang sentenced Tan to seven years' imprisonment and nine strokes of the cane despite the prosecution's arguments for life imprisonment and 24 strokes of the cane. By this point of time, due to Abdul Nasir Amer Hamsah's landmark appeal the year before, the definition of life imprisonment has been changed to mean the term of incarceration for the remainder of a prisoner's natural life. The prosecution appealed for a life term in October 1998, arguing that life imprisonment should be the benchmark sentence for killings that arose from gang-related fights in the interest of public order and safety, and cannot be lower than the maximum sentence for rape (which is 20 years). Under the law back then, an offence of culpable homicide not amounting to murder warranted either a life sentence, or up to ten years' imprisonment, in addition to caning or a fine.

However, the Court of Appeal disagreed with the prosecution that life imprisonment should be the benchmark sentence for gang killings, as the cases of such homicides may not arise from the same reason. Furthermore, the appellate judges stated that with the changes to the law and significant change of the length of life imprisonment from "20 years" to "natural life", they felt that this signalled the courts' need to be cautious before committing an offender, especially a young person, to life behind bars:

Extracted from Public Prosecutor v Tan Kei Loon Allan [1998] 3 SLR(R) 679:

On the question whether a sentence of life imprisonment was appropriate, we were naturally impressed by the implications of our decision in Abdul Nasir. Certainly, even with R119A, a sentence of life is now much harsher than it was before our ruling in Abdul Nasir. Whereas an accused person previously would serve a maximum sentence of 20 years, with a potential remission commuting his sentence to one of 13 years and 4 months, he must now serve a minimum of 20 years’ imprisonment, at which point his release would be within the discretion of a Life Imprisonment Review Board. So, the minimum period of incarceration is now six years and eight months longer, whilst the maximum period of incarceration, previously 20 years, is now the remainder of the prisoner's natural life. In this context it is equally important to note that under the old position, his release after 20 years would have been guaranteed, but a prisoner sentenced for life in respect of a crime committed after Abdul Nasir has no such peace of mind.

In that respect, we are of the view that the courts must now exercise caution before committing a young offender to life imprisonment. Contrary to traditional reasoning, in similar cases involving a youthful offender on the one hand and an older offender in the other, the youthful offender sentenced to life imprisonment would now be subject to a longer period of incarceration than an older offender, assuming they both lived to the same age.

The late High Court judge Lai Kew Chai (deceased since 2006), who delivered the verdict he finalized with Thean Lip Ping (L. P. Thean) and M. Karthigesu, also highlighted the limits to sentencing an offender to either life or up to ten years, given that judges cannot impose sentences of more than ten years but less than life, which would leave judges with the dilemma that a life term may be an excessive punishment for an offender convicted of culpable homicide, which was exactly the case for Tan based on the mitigating and aggravating factors of his case. In his own words, Justice Lai quoted:

Extracted from Public Prosecutor v Tan Kei Loon Allan [1998] 3 SLR(R) 679:

In a situation in which the court is desirous of a sentence greater than ten years, but feels that a sentence of life imprisonment is excessive, we have no choice but to come down, however reluctantly, on the side of leniency. Otherwise, the punishment imposed would significantly exceed the offender's culpability. It would, in our view, be wrong to adopt an approach in which the court would prefer an excessive sentence to an inadequate one.

As such, the prosecution's appeal was rejected, but the Court of Appeal increased Tan's sentence to the alternate maximum term of ten years' imprisonment and 15 strokes of the cane, as they conceded in agreement with the prosecution that Tan's seven-year sentence and nine-stroke caning were not manifestly adequate to address his culpability of the killing. However, the ruling in Tan's case was frequently referred to in subsequent cases of culpable homicide before the courts, where the prosecution sought a life term for the offender(s), in which some offenders were sentenced to life in prison while others get not more than ten years' imprisonment.

Eventually, in 2008, the Penal Code was revised and Section 304 of the Penal Code was amended to allow judges to impose sentences of either life or up to 20 years in jail with/without caning and/or a fine for future cases of culpable homicide not amounting to murder from 2008 onwards.

=== Public Prosecutor v Kho Jabing (2015) ===
On 14 January 2015, the prosecution appealed against the re-sentencing of Kho Jabing, a Malaysian who was convicted of the 2008 murder of a Chinese construction worker during an armed robbery. Kho was sentenced to death in 2010 for murder, but the 2013 legal reforms to the death penalty allowed Kho, like other death row prisoners in Singapore, to appeal for re-sentencing, and High Court judge Tay Yong Kwang (who is current Judge of Appeal since 2016) re-sentenced Kho to life in prison and 24 strokes of the cane. The ruling of the appeal, by a 3–2 decision, led to Kho being sentenced to death once again and he was eventually hanged on 20 May 2016 after several failed attempts to overturn his sentence.

The verdict is considered as a benchmark of sentencing guidelines for judges to decide between the death penalty and life sentence for murder, as the five judges, despite conflicting decisions between the majority and minority on the final sentence, unanimously agreed that the death penalty should be imposed in serious cases of murder where an offender, despite not having an intention to kill, exhibited viciousness and/or a blatant disregard for human life, and furthermore, if an offender's actions outraged the feelings of the community. This verdict of Kho's case effectively impacted on the outcomes of several future cases, where some murderers were sentenced to life imprisonment due to their conduct not sufficiently calling for the death sentence while others were executed.

== Legislation ==
=== Judicial sentencing powers ===
In Singapore, both the High Court and Court of Appeal have the power to sentence an offender to life imprisonment; and the Court of Appeal could either raise a fixed sentence to life, reduce a death sentence to life or reduce a life sentence to a fixed jail term. In the cases of Ridzuan Mega Abdul Rahman and Azlin Arujunah in 2022, who were both charged for the fatal abuse of their five-year-old son, the Court of Appeal increased the couple's sentences to life imprisonment, after finding Ridzuan guilty of causing grievous harm and Azlin guilty of murder. Convicted drug trafficker Aishamudin Jamaludin (who only acted as a courier in his case), had his sentence of 25 years' jail and caning (15 strokes) for a lower drug offence increased to life imprisonment and 15 strokes of the cane in 2020 due to the prosecution's appeal to convict him of the original capital drug charge. In a 1998 landmark case relating to the successful partial defence of sudden and grave provocation against murder, a Malaysian named Kwan Cin Cheng had his sentence increased from ten years to life imprisonment for culpable homicide by the Court of Appeal, due to the judges feeling that the manner of Kwan killing his girlfriend being too deplorable and violent that a ten-year term was manifestly inadequate despite their disagreement to the prosecution's arguments for the murder charge and death penalty. In another case, the Court of Appeal allowed the appeal of 55-year-old brothel owner Chan Lie Sian, who was convicted of the murder of William Tiah Hung Wai, and they re-sentenced Chan to life imprisonment after overturning his death sentence in July 2019.

Not only that, the President of Singapore have the power to grant a death row inmate clemency and commute his or her death sentence to life imprisonment, but since 1965, there were only six successful cases of clemency (two for drug trafficking and four for murder) when the President pardoned an inmate from execution in Singapore. The last case was in April 1998 when then President Ong Teng Cheong granted clemency to 19-year-old convicted murderer Mathavakannan Kalimuthu and commuted his sentence to life imprisonment. Not only that, the President also had the power to pardon a prisoner from serving a life sentence and order the convict's release, which was the case for Sim Ah Cheoh, a drug trafficker and mother of two who suffered from terminal cancer and thus asked the President for clemency a second time to allow her to be released and spend her remaining time with her family. Sim was originally sentenced to hang in 1988 for smuggling 1.37 kg of heroin before her death sentence was commuted to life imprisonment by a presidential pardon. After then President Ong Teng Cheong approved her second clemency petition, Sim was released in February 1995, and died one month later.

However, the Court of Appeal, being the highest court of the nation, also had the authority to increase a life sentence (or any other jail term) to the death penalty, as demonstrated by several cases like Rozman Jusoh (from seven years to death), Gerardine Andrew (from eight years to death), Kho Jabing (from life to death) and Chia Kee Chen (from life to death). The courts of Singapore also had the authority to acquit a person of an offence punishable by a life term, as demonstrated by some cases like that of Ramadass Punnusamy, a 41-year-old Malaysian and alleged drug courier who was originally sentenced to life with caning (15 strokes) for smuggling 1.875 kg of cannabis by the High Court before the Court of Appeal reviewed the case and found that both Ramadass and his co-accused Raj Kumar Aiyachami (originally sentenced to death) were innocent of the alleged drug offence, leading to the acquittal and release of both Ramadass and Raj in May 2022.

=== Parole conditions and sentencing ===
Before 20 August 1997, a life sentence meant a prison term of twenty years, and like all other fixed term sentences, it carried the usual one-third remission for good behaviour, which allowed prisoners to gain parole after serving at least two-thirds of their sentences. In the case of Bobby Chung Hua Watt, a murder convict and carpenter whose death sentence was commuted to life imprisonment in January 1980 after receiving clemency, he served two-thirds of his life term (equivalent to 13 years and four months) before he was released on parole for good behaviour and had the final third of the sentence remitted.

After the landmark appeal of Abdul Nasir Amer Hamsah on 20 August 1997, although life imprisonment is meant to last for the remainder of a convict's natural lifespan, the sentence still carries a possibility of release on parole after a minimum period of 20 years behind bars. A life convict can be eligible for parole based on his conduct in prison, albeit with conditions like no further instances of reoffending while the parole order remains in force and this remission order, which suspends the prisoner's life sentence, would last until the convict's death. Even if a convict is not eligible after reaching the 20-year mark of his sentence, he will still be periodically assessed annually until the authorities are satisfied that he becomes eligible for parole. However, according to Josephus Tan, a criminal lawyer who formerly defended several criminals at risk of facing the gallows, he stated that there was "no guarantee of release" for the life term prisoners despite their right to parole and he personally did not see any post-1997 cases of a life sentence prisoner being released on parole.

One instance of a "natural life sentence" convict being released on parole was Singaporean Vincent Lee Chuan Leong, who masterminded the kidnapping of a 14-year-old girl on 9 September 1999, and within the same month, Lee and his two accomplices were arrested and they were all sentenced to life imprisonment in April 2000. According to a YouTube video, Vincent Lee, who was 33 years old when committing the crime, was currently released on parole from prison at the age of 54 since 22 June 2020 after serving a total of 20 years, ten months and nine days in prison with good behaviour, and is employed as a lorry driver. However, Lee's case was the only known and reported case of a life term prisoner released on parole.

Unlike the United States and certain Western countries like England, the current life imprisonment laws in Singapore did not adopt a practice of life without parole, and the courts in Singapore had never imposed any consecutive natural life sentences on convicts in any case since after 1997. They decreed that all those people who received fixed prison terms other than life imprisonment would have to serve their fixed jail terms concurrently with life imprisonment, unless their life sentences were reduced and thus made the fixed jail terms to run consecutively with the reduced sentence.

Similarly, an offender sentenced to two or more terms of life imprisonment would have to serve the life terms concurrently instead of consecutively. One example was Soh Wee Kian, a former National Serviceman who killed a woman and grievously stabbed three more females in four stabbing incidents. Soh, who was assessed to be suffering from an adjustment disorder and thus had his murder charge reduced, was sentenced in August 2013 to serve two life sentences – one for culpable homicide not amounting to murder and another for a charge of causing grievous hurt with dangerous weapons – by the High Court, though however, the trial court ordered Soh to serve both terms of life imprisonment concurrently instead of consecutively. A much earlier case occurred in 1984 when Beh Meng Chai, a Malaysian and one of the three perpetrators of an armed-robbery and double murder case, was sentenced to two life sentences for two manslaughter charges, as well as ten years for each charge of armed robbery, although his life terms and other sentences were ordered to be served concurrently, in addition to 24 strokes of the cane.

=== Offences punishable with life ===
==== Penal Code ====
Under the Penal Code, there are more than forty offences that can result in life imprisonment. For certain offences, life imprisonment is the maximum penalty, while for some capital offences, life imprisonment is the minimum penalty under the law, notably murder with no intention to kill since 2013:

- Murder (§302(2)) (applicable only under S300(b), S300(c) and S300(d) of the Penal Code)
- Abetting the suicide of a person under the age of 18 or an "insane" person (§305)
- Robbery committed by five or more people that results in the death of a person (§396)
- Attempted murder with harm caused to the victim (§307)
- Culpable homicide not amounting to murder (§304)
- Criminal breach of trust by a public servant (§409)
- Causing grievous hurt with dangerous weapons/means (§326)
- Voluntarily causing hurt to extort property or to constrain to an illegal act (§329)
- Voluntarily causing hurt to extort confession or to compel restoration of property (§331)
- Voluntarily causing hurt to deter public servant from their duty (§333)
- Piracy (§130B) (Mandatory)

There is also a section of the Penal Code which slated that whoever was found guilty of committing attempted murder while serving a life sentence in Singapore, he/she would be automatically sentenced to death. Originally, the offence of rape was punishable by life imprisonment as the maximum sentence before the maximum sentence was amended to twenty years' imprisonment instead, due to the effects of life imprisonment being extended to natural life.

In October 2025, a new law was proposed to introduce life imprisonment (or up to 30 years in jail) as the maximum sentence for cases of fatal abuse of vulnerable victims.

==== Kidnapping Act ====
Under the Kidnapping Act, several kidnapping offences, notably kidnapping for ransom, dictates life imprisonment as the minimum punishment upon conviction.

Section 3 of the Kidnapping Act provides:

Whoever, with intent to hold any person for ransom, abducts or wrongfully restrains or wrongfully confines that person shall be guilty of an offence and shall be punished on conviction with death or imprisonment for life and shall, if he is not sentenced to death, also be liable to caning.

In certain cases of life imprisonment for kidnapping, caning is also potentially imposed (exclusively for male convicts) under certain circumstances like the vulnerability of the victim, the presence of weapons or if any harm/threat was made during the kidnapping. In the 2014 case of Sheng Siong kidnapper Lee Sze Yong, the High Court sentenced him to life imprisonment with three strokes of the cane for, with the abetment of Heng Chen Boon (who served three years' jail for wrongful confinement), abducting the 79-year-old mother of the Sheng Siong supermarket chain owner. In another kidnapping case that took place in 2003's Christmas Day, Tan Ping Koon and Chua Ser Lien (who committed suicide at Changi Prison in July 2020) were both jailed for life and caned three strokes for targeting and abducting a seven-year-old girl into their car. Selvaraju Satippan, who held a reporter and her maid hostage in 2003 and even used a knife to threaten and harm the victims, was given 24 strokes of the cane in addition to his life sentence for having committed arson, using a knife and caused harm to the hostages. Abdul Nasir Amer Hamsah, in another case, received 12 strokes of the cane and life imprisonment for kidnapping and holding two police officers hostage with another man in 1996.

In contrast to the above cases, caning was not imposed for Vincent Lee Chuan Leong and his two accomplices Shi Song Jing and Zhou Jian Guang, who were all sentenced to life imprisonment without caning for abducting a 14-year-old female student on account of their lack of criminal records and their proper care and treatment towards the girl while she was in their captivity. In the 2001 Tay Teng Joo kidnapping case, both Agnes Ng Lei Eng and Ng Soon Teck were jailed for life but spared the cane due to Agnes Ng being a female and both were unarmed unlike the mastermind Chng Teo Heng, who was caned six times (in addition to a life sentence) for using a knife.

==== Misuse of Drugs Act ====
Since 2013, the changes to the death penalty laws for capital drug trafficking allowed judges to have the discretion to sentence drug traffickers to life imprisonment, provided that they acted as couriers, cooperated with the authorities to disrupt drug-related activities and/or suffering from mental illnesses. Notable cases of traffickers who received life imprisonment includes Yong Vui Kong, a Malaysian who was initially sentenced to death before the reduction of his sentence to life.

There were also certain offences where trafficking of drugs with amounts below the capital threshold may also attract life imprisonment as a possible punishment, which is also the maximum for the trafficking of such amounts.

==== Arms Offences Act ====
Under the Arms Offences Act, there were several offences that would warrant life imprisonment upon conviction, either as the mandatory sentence in some cases, or the minimum or maximum punishment for several others. These include trafficking of arms, and unlawful possessions of firearms upon arrest for any scheduled offence.

One example of a person sentenced to life in prison under the Act was Muhammad Iskandar Sa'at, a 23-year-old Singaporean who was the culprit of the Khoo Teck Puat Hospital shooting incident in 2015, in which he snatched a revolver with attempt to cause hurt to Staff Sergeant Muhammad Sadli bin Razali while attempting to escape from the hospital, where he was receiving medical treatment shortly after his capture for theft. Iskandar was sentenced to a mandatory term of life imprisonment and 18 strokes of the cane after pleading guilty to a reduced charge of unlawful possession of a firearm for causing hurt to a public servant.

Another case was Nyu Kok Meng, a Malaysian who, together with serial killer Sek Kim Wah, robbed a businessman and his family while armed with a knife and a stolen military rifle. Although Nyu did not help Sek to murder three of the five hostages, he faced charges of using a firearm to commit armed robbery under the Arms Offences Act, and he was sentenced to life imprisonment with six strokes of the cane on 9 July 1985.

==== Hijacking of Aircraft and Protection of Aircraft and International Airports Act ====
Under Section 124 of the Hijacking of Aircraft and Protection of Aircraft and International Airports Act, an offender can be sentenced to life imprisonment as the mandatory punishment if they were found guilty under this Act for whichever offences related to:

1. hijacking of aircraft
2. violence against passengers or crew members
3. destroying, damaging or endangering the safety of aircraft
4. and endangering safety at aerodromes

This law was first enacted since 1978.

== Sentencing conditions and exceptions ==
There are several conditions and exceptions for courts in Singapore to consider in cases where a person faces a potential life sentence under the law for whichever scheduled offence charged.

=== Mentally ill offenders ===
==== Cases of culpable homicide not amounting to murder ====
For instance, should a person suffering from a mental illness was charged with any offence punishable by life (or less than life), notably culpable homicide not amounting to murder (or manslaughter), the courts has to ascertain the extent of diminished responsibility suffered by the person. While the defence of diminished responsibility could enable the reduction of a murder charge to culpable homicide, it was also a condition where the judges can refer to as a relevant factor of consideration on whether life imprisonment, as the maximum punishment, should be imposed on the offender. In several cases of life imprisonment for mentally ill offenders, the judges were of the opinion that the offender should be committed to a sentence of life behind bars if the condition presents him/her as a psychiatric danger to society and to himself.

In the 2006 precedent case of 37-year-old Constance Chee Cheong Hin, a former air stewardess who abducted four-year-old Sindee Neo and threw her off the girl's flat, causing Neo to die from fatal head injuries five days later, she was sentenced to 13 years' imprisonment for wrongful abduction and culpable homicide (three years for the first charge and ten years for the second charge). In rejecting the prosecution's arguments and psychiatric opinion for life imprisonment in Chee's case, then High Court judge V. K. Rajah stated that Chee should not be liable for life imprisonment on account that she had strong familial support, with her three sisters writing to the court their affirmation to take care of Chee and ensure she had proper treatment for her schizophrenia, with one of her sisters making plans for Chee to live with her permanently after her release, and with reference to another medical report, Justice Rajah noted that with consistent and sufficient medical treatment, Chee's schizophrenic condition would eventually get better and hence, her psychiatric condition was not severe enough to the extent of needing to have Chee separated from society for as long as life, thus making life imprisonment inappropriate for her.

The case of Constance Chee was referred to in several cases. One of the cases was Guen Garlejo Aguilar, a Filipino maid who killed her friend Jane Parangan La Puebla and disposed of two suitcases containing the victim's dismembered body parts at Orchard Road and MacRitchie Reservoir respectively. Aguilar, who was found to be suffering from depression, pleaded guilty to a reduced charge of culpable homicide and sentenced to ten years in jail. V. K. Rajah, the judge who also heard Constance Chee's case, heard Aguilar's case and took into consideration the root of her illness being her financial woes, and that with strong familial support, and her progressive recovery from depression since the start of her treatment while in remand, Aguilar's future risk of re-offending was low. Justice Rajah quoted about the conduct of Aguilar under influence of her depression, "By choosing to plant the deceased's head and torso in two very public places, her behaviour strikes one as nothing short of incoherent and incomprehensible,... Her post-offence conduct was baffling and testament to the workings of a tortured mind".

Another was the 2005 case of 27-year-old Lim Ah Liang, a male prostitute who stabbed and hammered his 37-year-old lover Ho Kien Leong to death. Lim was initially charged with murder but pled guilty to culpable homicide due to dysthymia, a life-long depressive disorder, that severely impaired his mental faculties at the time of the killing. The trial judge, V. K. Rajah (judge of the above two cases), having considered the elderly age of Lim's mother and stepfather, the lack of familial support, and the lifelong need to subject Lim to medication and a controlled environment based on his condition, decided to sentence Lim to life imprisonment.

==== Cases of drug trafficking ====
Since 2013, the changes to the Misuse of Drugs Act decreed that all judges were to impose a mandatory life sentence for drug traffickers who were suffering from mental illnesses, provided that their conditions had substantially impaired their mental responsibility at the time of the offence. This requirement for eligibility, if fulfilled, could spare such drug offenders from the death penalty in spite of the amount of drugs exceeding the capital threshold.

In the case of Dinesh Pillai Reja Retnam, he became the first drug trafficker to have his death sentence lowered to life imprisonment during a 2013 re-sentencing trial by the High Court on the grounds of diminished responsibility, as he was assessed to suffer from depression at the time he trafficked 19.35g of heroin. Pang Siew Fum, the 60-year-old accomplice of drug courier Cheong Chun Yin (who smuggled 2,726g of heroin from Myanmar to Singapore), was also re-sentenced to life imprisonment in 2015 as a result of depression. Upon his appeal in 2022, 50-year-old Roszaidi Osman's death sentence was reduced to life imprisonment by the Court of Appeal through a 3–2 majority decision on account of his depression and substance use disorder despite his offence of trafficking 32.54g of pure heroin.

==== Mentally unsound offenders ====
However, for cases of people who were mentally unsound when they commit any offences that warrant life imprisonment, they would be acquitted of any charges and indefinitely detained at the President's Pleasure, and they would serve their detention at a mental facility, prison or any other safe places in custody. These offenders would be subject to regular psychiatric assessments until they were found mentally fit and suitable for release back into society. In September 2022, Commonwealth double killer Gabriel Lien Goh was acquitted of culpable homicide not amounting to murder (punishable by life) for killing his mother and grandmother in October 2019, as he was found to be suffering from acute hallucinogen intoxication at the time of the killings and hence was of substantial unsound mind when he committed the murders of his mother and grandmother, since his drug consumption caused him to experience illusions, hallucinations and paranoid delusions at the time of the offences. After this acquittal, Goh was detained at the President's Pleasure.

=== Underaged offenders ===
There was no minimum age set for a person to be sentenced to life imprisonment. However, certain laws still prohibit the imprisonment of children, although with a few exceptions.

Under Section 37 of the Children and Young Persons Act (CYPA), it was decreed that a child below the age of 14 years will not be incarcerated for any offence. This is similarly applied for a person aged 14 and above but below 16, who would be detained at a juvenile rehabilitation centre, although the courts had the authority to order otherwise through evaluations of his character. These two above laws prohibit life imprisonment for young offenders from these two age groups.

However, if a child or young person is convicted of a very serious crime that potentially requires a sentence of life imprisonment, and the court found that life imprisonment was the only available and suitable option to deploy during sentencing, the offender will be detained for a period of time as specified in the sentence under Section 38 of the CYPA. They would be subjected to similar conditions for eligibility of parole like adult offenders serving life in prison.

Under Section 314 of the Criminal Procedure Code from 2010 onwards, if a person was found guilty of committing murder, drug trafficking or other offences punishable by death when he was below 18 years old, the convict would not receive the death penalty, and instead, he would be committed to a mandatory term of life imprisonment as an alternative punishment instead. Before its abolition in 2010, a sentence of indefinite detention at the President's Pleasure was imposed for minors who commit capital crimes while under the age of 18.

The first underaged offender to be sentenced to life imprisonment for a capital offence was Zin Mar Nwe, a Myanmar maid who was charged with killing an elderly Indian woman at Choa Chu Kang in June 2018. Zin Mar Nwe, who used a knife to stab the 70-year-old victim 26 times (and it led to the woman's death), was 17 years old when she committed the offence, and after the defendant was found guilty of murder in May 2023, the trial judge Andre Maniam noted that Zin was a minor at the time of the offence, and the Criminal Procedure Code also prohibited the imposition of capital punishment for offenders who were below 18 when committing murder, and that a life sentence should be the only punishment required for such cases. As a result, Zin Mar Nwe was spared the gallows and instead, she was sentenced to life imprisonment on 4 July 2023. Two years later, Zin's murder conviction was reduced to manslaughter upon her appeal, and her life sentence was commuted to 17 years' imprisonment in August 2025.

=== Elderly offenders ===
There was also no legislation that prohibit the imposition of life imprisonment for elderly offenders who commit crimes that warrant such a sentence in Singapore. However, in several cases, where an elderly offender faces a sentence of either life or less than life for any crimes punishable by life, the courts and/or lawyers (from either the prosecution or defence) would be cautioned against imposing imprisonment terms that may exceed the remainder of the defendant's lifespan, meaning that the sentence should not be contextually as long as life imprisonment in view of the defendant's age or health, unless in any exceptional circumstances. In the case of Tan Nam Seng, a 72-year-old retired shipping company owner who was convicted of culpable homicide for killing his 38-year-old son-in-law Spencer Tuppani in 2017 for cheating on his daughter (also Tuppani's wife) and business, the judge Dedar Singh Gill noted that Tan suffered from major depressive disorder, as well as two heart attacks and tuberculosis while in remand, and thus exercised his leniency to sentence Tan to eight-and-a-half years' jail on 21 September 2020 due to his advanced age and increasingly poor health. In another case, 86-year-old Pak Kian Huat, alias Pek Kiah Huat, who was charged in 2019 for using a chopper to hack his 79-year-old partner Lim Soi Moy to death over her refusal to let him use a bigger bedroom, was sentenced to 15 years' jail for culpable homicide, with the trial judge See Kee Oon calling the offence "deliberately and unspeakably vicious and brutal" for Pak's remorseless conduct and his actions of inflicting 54 knife wounds on Lim over a trivial dispute, and stated that Pak's advanced age was not a mitigating factor in light of the brutality of the attack and would have warranted life imprisonment, which the prosecution did not pursue.

However, in cases where an elderly offender was found guilty of a criminal offence that mandates a life sentence, or a capital charge that attracts a sentence of either life or death, the courts were not restricted from the possibility of sentencing such convicts to life imprisonment if they felt that the death penalty is inappropriate or that the life sentence was the only option. In the case of 69-year-old Seet Cher Hng, who was convicted of murder for killing his wife Low Hwee Geok at ITE College Central in 2018, the High Court sentenced him to a life term after the prosecution decided to not pursue the death penalty. Similarly, for 67-year-old Toh Sia Guan, a homeless man who fatally stabbed 52-year-old coffee shop helper Goh Eng Thiam during a fight at Geylang in 2016, he was found guilty of murder and sentenced to life in prison in 2020, despite his advanced age and poor health. In a third case, Pung Ah Kiang, a Singaporean who was 61 years old at the time of sentencing, was sentenced to life imprisonment as he was acting as a mere courier when he assisted 41-year-old Malaysian Kishor Kumar Raguan (sentenced to death) to traffic 36.05g of heroin.

== Life imprisonment cases in Singapore ==
=== Murder ===
- Koh Swee Beng, a Singaporean found guilty of murdering 31-year-old moneylender Tay Kim Teck, who assaulted Koh’s godfather, with whom Koh shared a good relationship with. Koh was sentenced to hang in 1990 but two days before he was due to be executed, Koh was granted clemency on 13 May 1992, and his death sentence was commuted to life imprisonment by then President Wee Kim Wee. Koh was released on parole in September 2005.
- Mathavakannan Kalimuthu, a Singaporean gang member who, together with two friends (both executed for murder), killed 25-year-old rival gang member Saravanan Michael Ramalingam during a gang fight in 1996, and he was merely 18 years and 16 days old at the time of the crime. He was initially sentenced to death for murder in the same year of his crime before then President Ong Teng Cheong granted him clemency and commuted his sentence to life imprisonment on 28 April 1998. Mathavakannan was released on parole since 2012.
- Kho Jabing, a Malaysian rag-and-bone man who robbed and fatally injured 40-year-old Chinese national Cao Ruyin in 2008. His death sentence was initially reduced to life imprisonment in a 2013 re-sentencing trial before the Court of Appeal sentenced him to death a second time. He was hanged at the age of 32 on 20 May 2016.
- Wang Wenfeng, a Chinese national who robbed and killed 57-year-old taxi driver Yuen Swee Hong. Wang was originally condemned to death in 2011 for Yuen's murder before the sentence was commuted to life imprisonment and 24 strokes of the cane during a re-sentencing trial on 14 November 2013.
- Lim Wee Thong, a 48-year-old Singaporean and former prison officer who was sentenced to life imprisonment and 24 strokes of the cane on 13 March 2014 for the 2011 murder of his girlfriend Loh Nyuk Moi.
- Tony Anak Imba, a Malaysian foreign worker who murdered 41-year-old Indian national Shanmuganathan Dillidurai during a gang robbery in 2010. He was sentenced on 20 April 2015 to life imprisonment and 24 strokes of the cane.
- Chia Kee Chen, a Singaporean businessman who murdered his wife's 37-year-old ex-lover Dexmon Chua Yizhi in 2013. He was originally sentenced to life in jail on 4 August 2017 before the Court of Appeal increased his sentence to death upon the prosecution's appeal a year later.
- Yaacob Mohamed Yatim, a Singaporean who murdered his friend Abdul Rashid Mohd Nenggal during a fight. Yaacob was sentenced to incarceration for life on 19 April 2018 but spared the cane due to his age of 58.
- Syed Maffi Hasan, a 24-year-old jobless Singaporean who killed his 23-year-old friend Atika Dolkifli by throwing her off a multistorey carpark at Toa Payoh. Syed Maffi was sentenced to life imprisonment and 12 strokes of the cane on 4 July 2019.
- Chan Lie Sian, a Singaporean brothel owner who fatally injured his 35-year-old customer William Tiah Hung Wai. He was initially sentenced to death for murder in 2017 before he successfully appealed to reduce his sentence to life imprisonment on 30 July 2019; he was not caned due to his age of 55.
- Leslie Khoo Kwee Hock, a Singaporean laundry shop manager who murdered his 31-year-old Chinese girlfriend Cui Yajie and burning her body. He was sentenced to life imprisonment on 19 August 2019, but evaded caning due to his age of 51.
- Boh Soon Ho, a Malaysian who murdered his 28-year-old girlfriend and China-born nurse Zhang Huaxiang. Boh was sentenced to life imprisonment on 8 February 2020, but spared the cane due to his age of 51.
- Toh Sia Guan, a homeless Singaporean and "Karung guni" man who fatally stabbed 52-year-old coffee shop helper Goh Eng Thiam during a physical fight. He was sentenced to life in prison for murder on 3 March 2020, but spared the cane due to his age of 67.
- Ahmad Muin Yaacob, a Malaysian cleaner (aged 23 in 2016) on a temporary work permit who robbed and killed his 54-year-old supervisor Maimunah Awang. He pleaded guilty to murder and was sentenced to life imprisonment and 18 strokes of the cane on 4 November 2020.
- Daryati, an Indonesian maid (aged 23 in 2016) who fatally stabbed her employer Seow Kim Choo and slashed Seow's husband Ong Thiam Soon (who survived the attack) at the couple's Telok Kurau family home. Daryati was found guilty of murder and sentenced to life imprisonment on 23 April 2021, and she lost her appeal against her life sentence and conviction on 31 March 2022.
- Seet Cher Hng, a 66-year-old Singaporean and retiree who murdered his 54-year-old ex-wife Low Hwee Geok at the carpark of ITE College Central over alleged money issues in 2018. He was convicted of murder and sentenced to life imprisonment on 22 September 2021 but spared the cane due to his age of 69.
- Mohammad Rosli Abdul Rahim, a 48-year-old Singaporean who killed his 35-year-old housemate Mohammad Roslan Zaini by stabbing him fatally in the chest. For the charge of murdering Roslan, Rosli was sentenced to lifetime imprisonment five years later on 13 January 2022 but spared the cane due to his age of 52.
- Mohamed Aliff Mohamed Yusoff, a 27-year-old Singaporean who killed his girlfriend's nine-month old son Izz Fayyaz Zayani Ahmad. He was sentenced to life imprisonment and 15 strokes of the cane on 11 August 2022.
- Surajsrikan Diwakar Mani Tripathi, a 20-year-old jobless Singaporean who murdered 38-year-old Singaporean Tay Rui Hao in 2020 while the victim was jogging near Punggol Field. He was sentenced on 15 September 2022 to life in prison and 15 strokes of the cane.
- Naing Lin, a Myanmar national who stabbed his friend Myo Kyaw Thu during an argument and caused Myo to bleed to death overnight in their rented flat. Naing pleaded guilty to murder and was sentenced to incarceration for life on 22 September 2022, but spared the cane due to his age of 51.
- Azlin Arujunah, a 30-year-old Singaporean woman who murdered her five-year-old son by fatally scalding the child multiple times with hot water. Despite the prosecution's arguments for the death penalty due to the heinous, inhumane and cold-blooded nature of the case, the Court of Appeal sentenced Azlin to life imprisonment for murder in October 2022.
- Muhammad Salihin Ismail, a Singaporean man who was charged with the murder of his stepdaughter. Initially jailed for nine years with caning (12 strokes) for causing grievous hurt, the Court of Appeal allowed the prosecution's appeal and sentenced Salihin to life imprisonment and 12 strokes of the cane for the original charge of murder on 2 April 2024.
- Tan Sen Yang, a 32-year-old Singaporean found guilty of murdering 31-year-old chemist Satheesh Noel Gobidass at Orchard Towers in 2019. Tan was sentenced to life imprisonment and 12 strokes of the cane on 25 April 2024.
- Heng Boon Chai, a 46-year-old Singaporean sentenced to life imprisonment on 7 November 2024 for the 2021 murder of Kim Wee Ming, who was a hawker assistant and Heng's 46-year-old neighbour. Heng was previously charged in 2007 with murdering his uncle but was jailed eight years for manslaughter due to his schizophrenic condition.
- Nguyen Ngoc Giau, who was sentenced to life in prison on 7 October 2025 for the 2021 murder of her boyfriend Cho Wang Keung.
- Ng Boon Hong, who was sentenced to life imprisonment on 1 July 2026 for the 2023 murder of his 61-year-old roommate Ang Cheng Kek. He spared the cane due to his age of 63.
- Sumiyati, an Indonesian domestic maid who was sentenced to life imprisonment on 29 July 2026 for the 2022 murder of her employer's 73-year-old father Low Hoon Cheong.
- Huang Bocan, a Singaporean sentenced to life imprisonment on 5 November 2026 for the 2021 murder of Huang Baoying, his 19-year-old younger sister.

=== Culpable homicide not amounting to murder ===
- Beh Meng Chai, a Malaysian welder who was sentenced to two concurrent life sentences and 24 strokes of the cane on 8 October 1984 for killing two people during a 1980 armed robbery case
- Kwan Cin Cheng, a Malaysian who stabbed his ex-girlfriend to death in October 1996. He was originally charged with murder before the trial court found him guilty of culpable homicide not amounting to murder and sentenced him to ten years in prison. Although the prosecution lost their appeal for a murder conviction, the Court of Appeal increased Kwan’s jail term to life imprisonment in January 1998.
- Ong Teng Siew, a 27-year-old Malaysian chicken slaughterer who was originally condemned on death row for the murder of his 82-year-old friend and opium addict Ng Gee Seh, but after a re-trial based on new psychiatric evidence, his conviction for murder was reduced to manslaughter and his death sentence was commuted to life imprisonment in May 1998.
- Muhamad Hasik bin Sahar, a Singaporean gang member who, at age 22, was convicted of killing 17-year-old soccer player Sulaiman Hashim during a gang-related attack. He was sentenced to life in jail and 16 strokes of the cane on 9 May 2002.
- Saminathan Subramaniam, a Singaporean odd-job worker sentenced to life in prison and 18 strokes of the cane for killing his wife's godfather.
- Sundarti Supriyanto, an Indonesian maid who, at age 24, was initially charged with murder but later found guilty of culpable homicide not amounting to murder for the deaths of her 34-year-old employer Angie Ng Wee Peng (who abused and starved her) and Ng's three-year-old daughter Crystal Poh Shi Qi. She was sentenced to life imprisonment on 25 September 2004.
- Purwanti Parji, an Indonesian maid who, at age 17 years and ten months, killed her 57-year-old employer Har Chit Heang due to her rage over alleged maid abuse by Har. Originally charged with murder, Purwanti pleaded guilty to a reduced charge of culpable homicide and sentenced to life imprisonment on 29 September 2004.
- Juminem, an Indonesian maid who was found guilty of manslaughter and sentenced to life imprisonment in September 2005 for killing her employer Esther Ang Imm Suan. Her accomplice Siti Aminah served ten years in jail for the same offence.
- Mohammad Zam Abdul Rashid, a Singaporean caretaker who was sentenced to life imprisonment in September 2006 for the 2005 manslaughter of his wife.
- G. Krishnasamy Naidu, a Singaporean taxi driver whose death sentence was commuted to life in prison after his conviction for murdering his wife was reduced to manslaughter upon appeal in October 2006.
- Lim Ah Liang, a 27-year-old Singaporean and male prostitute who killed his 35-year-old ex-lover Ho Kien Leong. As he suffered from a severe life-long condition of dysthymia (a chronic depressive disorder), Lim pleaded guilty to a lower charge of culpable homicide and sentenced to life imprisonment on 16 March 2007.
- Barokah, a 26-year-old Indonesian maid who was sentenced to life imprisonment for killing her elderly employer Wee Keng Wah in October 2005
- Soh Wee Kian, a 23-year-old Singaporean and former National Serviceman who was sentenced in August 2013 to two concurrent terms of life imprisonment for one charge of culpable homicide and another of voluntarily causing grievous hurt by dangerous weapons. Soh, who suffered from adjustment disorder, had attacked four women during a nine-month crime spree between January and September 2010, leaving the first three victims seriously injured and the fourth stabbed to death.
- Sujay Solomon Sutherson, an Indian immigrant who, in 2012, suffered from a relapse of his schizophrenia and killed his 56-year-old mother Mallika Jesudasan before attempting to decapitate her and burn her body. Sujay was convicted of culpable homicide not amounting to murder on 11 August 2015, and sentenced to life imprisonment a month later on 15 September 2015. Seven years later, on 8 September 2022, while he was serving his sentence at Changi Prison, Sujay died at the age of 41 in Changi General Hospital due to blood poisoning.
- Raja Vinayagar, a schizophrenic Singaporean who killed his eldest sister in August 2019. He was sentenced to life in prison on 14 September 2021, but spared the cane due to his age of 50.
- An unnamed man, who was found guilty of the 2017 fatal abuse and manslaughter of his daughter Ayeesha, was sentenced to life imprisonment on 11 July 2025.

=== Causing grievous hurt by dangerous means ===
- Ridzuan Mega Abdul Rahman, a jobless Singaporean (aged 30 in 2022) whose original murder charge was reduced to causing grievous hurt by dangerous means in relation to the fatal abuse of his five-year-old son, and his sentence was initially 27 years in jail before it was increased to a life sentence by the Court of Appeal on 12 July 2022.

=== Rape ===
- Alwi bin Masod, a Singaporean who received a life sentence and ten strokes of the cane on 8 January 1970 for raping a British woman. He was the first convicted rapist to be given life imprisonment in Singapore.
- Chua Kim Yong, a Singaporean who, on 7 October 1975, received a life term and 20 strokes of the cane for the rape of two little girls.
- Mohamed Said bin Tik, a Singaporean who was sentenced on 1 March 1976 to life imprisonment and ten strokes of the cane for raping nine-year-old schoolgirl Yatimah binte Abdul Rahman before leaving her to die. Said also received a concurrent sentence of ten years for the second charge of manslaughter with respect to killing Yatimah.
- Suahamad bin Mamin, a Singaporean who was sentenced to life in prison and 24 strokes of the cane on 17 July 1978 for the rape of three young girls aged between five and six.
- Tan Chin Beng, a Singaporean sentenced to life imprisonment and 25 strokes of the cane on 13 March 1984 for the rape of five young girls aged ten and below.
- Sim Ah Seng, a Singaporean who was sentenced to life for the rape of a 15-year-old student and also given 15 strokes of the cane for the same offence on 25 January 1985.

=== Arms-related crimes ===
- Nyu Kok Meng, a Malaysian who was found guilty of committing armed robbery while in possession of a firearm in 1983, when he was merely 19. Nyu was sentenced to life behind bars and caning of six strokes on 9 July 1985.
- Ong Leng Chye, Tan Soon Ai and Low Boon Tiong, the three armed robbers of the $1.4 million Poh Heng jewellery heist, who were all sentenced to life imprisonment in June 1993. Ong and Low received 12 strokes of the cane each while Tan received 18 strokes.
- Ng Theng Shuang, a Malaysian gunman sentenced to life in prison and ten strokes of the cane in 1994 for committing armed robbery with a firearm. However, Ng also received a death sentence for discharging a firearm during the same trial, and therefore, he was executed on 14 July 1995.
- Lim Peck Hui, a Singaporean secret society member, who at age 26, armed himself with a gun while committing the robbery of a businessman Chia Cheong Beng. On 19 September 2001, Lim was found guilty and sentenced to life imprisonment and eight strokes of the cane.
- Muhammad Iskandar bin Sa'at, a 23-year-old Singaporean and perpetrator of the Khoo Teck Puat Hospital shooting case. Iskandar was initially charged with the unlawful discharge of a firearm (which warrants the mandatory death penalty) before he was sentenced to life imprisonment and 18 strokes of the cane for a reduced charge of unlawful possession of a firearm to cause hurt to a public servant.

=== Kidnapping ===
- Abdul Nasir Amer Hamsah, a 25-year-old Singaporean who was found guilty of kidnapping two police officers for ransom, and sentenced on 3 March 1997 to life imprisonment and 12 strokes of the cane, in addition to a consecutive 18-year sentence and 18 strokes of caning for a fatal robbery case. His appeal against his life term was instrumental to the significant legal changes to the definition of life imprisonment under Singapore law.
- Vincent Lee Chuan Leong, Shi Song Jing and Zhou Jian Guang, the trio who were all sentenced to life in prison in April 2000 for the 1999 kidnapping of a 14-year-old schoolgirl. Lee, a Singaporean, was released on parole in June 2020.
- Agnes Ng Lei Eng, Ng Soon Teck and Chng Teo Heng, the three co-defendants found guilty of the 2001 kidnapping of Tay Teng Joo, a Singaporean businessman. Chng was also given six strokes of the cane for using a knife to threaten the victim.
- Chua Ser Lien and Tan Ping Koon, the two kidnappers who abducted a seven-year-old girl for ransom during Christmas Day of 2003. Both men were each sentenced to lifetime imprisonment and three strokes of the cane on 9 September 2004; Chua died in prison 17 years later due to suicide.
- Lee Sze Yong, the mastermind of the Sheng Siong kidnapping of 2014. He was sentenced to life in prison and three strokes of the cane on 1 December 2016.

=== Drug trafficking ===
- Sim Ah Cheoh, a Singaporean housewife and single parent with two sons. She was originally condemned to death in 1988 for smuggling 1.37 kg of heroin before President Wee Kim Wee granted her clemency and commuted her sentence to life imprisonment on 25 March 1992. Her two accomplices were executed eight days after her date of pardon. Sim was later pardoned and released from prison in February 1995 due to terminal cancer, and died at the age of 47 a month later.
- Yong Vui Kong, a 19-year-old Malaysian who was originally sentenced to death in 2008 for smuggling 47g of heroin before the sentence was commuted to life imprisonment and 15 strokes of the cane in a re-sentencing trial on 15 November 2013.
- Cheong Chun Yin, a Malaysian drug courier (aged 24 in 2008) who was originally condemned to death in 2010 for smuggling 2.7 kg of heroin before the sentence was commuted to life imprisonment and 15 strokes of the cane in a re-sentencing trial on 20 April 2015.
- Pang Siew Fum, a 60-year-old Malaysian drug trafficker and Cheong Chun Yin's accomplice who was originally sentenced to death in 2010 for smuggling 2.7 kg of heroin before the sentence was commuted to life imprisonment in a re-sentencing trial on 20 April 2015, as a result of her major depressive disorder.
- Christeen Jayamany, a Singaporean drug courier who was caught importing 44.96g of diamorphine in 2011. She received a life sentence on 8 May 2015 but spared the cane since she was female, while her accomplice Datchinamurthy Kataiah was sentenced to death and hanged on 25 September 2025.
- Mohamad Yazid Md Yusof, a Singaporean drug courier who was caught importing 120.90g of diamorphine in 2013. He was sentenced to life imprisonment and 15 strokes of the cane on 1 June 2016, while both his accomplices Norasharee Gous and Kalwant Singh Jogindar Singh were sentenced to death and hanged on 7 July 2022.
- Dominic Martin Fernandez, a Malaysian drug runner who was caught delivering 33.89g of diamorphine. He was sentenced to life imprisonment and 15 strokes of the cane on 8 August 2017. His accomplice Nazeri Lajim was condemned to death and hanged on 22 July 2022.
- Mazlan bin Yusoff, a Singaporean drug courier who was caught delivering 18.71g of diamorphine in July 2015. He was sentenced to life imprisonment on 26 March 2018 but was spared the cane since he was above the age of 50 at the time of his sentencing. His accomplice, Tan Kay Yong, on the other hand, was sentenced to death and hanged on 26 November 2025.
- Zulkarnain bin Kemat, a drug courier who was caught delivering 301.6g of diamorphine in November 2013. He was sentenced to life imprisonment on 12 March 2018 but was spared the cane since he was above the age of 50 at the time of his sentencing. His accomplices, Mohammad Rizwan and Saminathan Selvaraju, on the other hand, were both condemned to death and hanged on 27 November 2025.
- Nuraiin Rosman, a Singaporean sentenced to life imprisonment for drug trafficking in 2018. Her accomplices Ong Seow Ping and Abdul Rahim Shapiee were both sentenced to death and hanged on 5 August 2022.
- Muhammad Haikal bin Abdullah, a Malaysian drug courier sentenced to life imprisonment and 15 strokes of the cane in July 2018. His accomplice Saridewi binte Djamani was sentenced to death and hanged on 28 July 2023.
- Roszaidi Osman, a drug convict who was arrested and initially condemned to death in January 2019 for trafficking 32.54g of pure heroin. After a series of appeals and re-trial, Roszaidi's death sentence was eventually commuted to life imprisonment by the Court of Appeal with a majority decision of 3 to 2 on 1 December 2022.
- Tristan Tan Yi Rui, who was originally condemned to death for trafficking not less than 337.6 grams of methamphetamine, successfully had his death sentence commuted to life imprisonment on 14 August 2025 after President Tharman Shanmugaratnam approved his clemency plea.
- Yogesswaran C. Manogaran, a Malaysian citizen and warehouse assistant who was caught delivering 24.81g of diamorphine in January 2020. He was sentenced to life imprisonment and 15 strokes of the cane on 19 June 2023, while his accomplice, Teo Yiu Kin Tee, was awarded the mandatory death sentence and hanged three years later on 7 August 2026 at the age of 79.

=== Attempted murder ===
- Jimmy Chua Hwa Soon, a 25-year-old Singaporean and Singapore Armed Forces (SAF) sergeant who was sentenced to life imprisonment on 14 April 1997 for the attempted murder of his four-year-old nephew during a knife attack. Chua, however, also received the death penalty for murdering the boy's 39-year-old mother Neo Lam Lye in the same case and he was thus executed.

=== War crimes ===
This section covers the list of defendants, mainly Japanese army and Kempeitai officers, who were responsible for the war atrocities that occurred during the Japanese occupation of Singapore (1942–1945), and they were tried and sentenced to life terms in Singapore under British laws enacted by the colonial government:

- Takuma Nishimura, commander of the Imperial Guards Division. He was sentenced to life imprisonment in 1947 for initiating the Sook Ching massacre of Chinese civilians in Singapore. Nishimura was eventually sentenced to death and executed by an Australian military court in 1951 for additional war atrocities committed at Malaya (presently known as Malaysia).
- Yokota Yoshitaka, Jyo Tomotatsu, Onishi Satoru, and Hisamatsu Haruji, the four other Japanese military officials who were sentenced to life imprisonment in 1947 for torturing and murdering both prisoners and civilians during the Japanese occupation of Singapore. All four of them, after serving five years out of their sentences, were eventually released in 1952 and deported to Japan, where they continued to serve the remainder of their sentences.
- Warrant Officer Sakamoto Shigeru, Sergeant Kasahara Hideo and Nigo Masayoshi (an interpreter), three of the 21 defendants who were charged and tried for war crimes in the 1946 Double Tenth incident trial. All three of them were found guilty and sentenced to life imprisonment while the rest were either acquitted, executed or served jail terms ranging between eight and fifteen years.

== See also ==
- Life imprisonment
- Crime in Singapore
- Law of Singapore
- Capital punishment in Singapore
- Caning in Singapore
- List of major crimes in Singapore
- Oriental Hotel murder
