= Murder of Phang Ai Looi =

1996 case of a woman stabbed to death by her boyfriend

Phang Ai Looi
- Born: Phang Ai Looi c. 1973; Ayer Tawar, Perak, Malaysia
- Died: 4 October 1996 (aged 23); Yung Kwang Road, Jurong, Singapore
- Cause of death: Murdered
- Education: High school education (Malaysia)
- Occupation: Clerk (former)
- Known for: Murder victim

On the night of 4 October 1996, at a carpark in Singapore's Yung Kwang Road, 23-year-old Phang Ai Looi (Chinese: 彭爱蕊; pinyin: Péng Aìrǔi; Bàng-uâ-cê : Pàng Ái-lūi ), a Malaysian from Perak, was stabbed to death by her former boyfriend, who was caught on that same night after his attempt at suicide. The suspect, 29-year-old Kwan Cin Cheng (Chinese: 关进清; pinyin: Guān Jìnqīng; Pe̍h-ōe-jī: Koan Chìn-chheng), who was a Perak-born Malaysian working in Singapore, was charged with murder. Kwan, who first met Phang in 1988 and dated her, found out some time before the murder that Phang was cheating on him with another man, and when Kwan met her on that night with a threat to kill himself should Phang not return to him, Phang reportedly made a cold-blooded remark that she was much happier with the other man, which deeply provoked Kwan to stabbing Phang to death.

In April 1997, Kwan was convicted of manslaughter and sentenced to jail for ten years, after the trial court accepted that Kwan's defence that he killed Phang after losing his self-control due to sudden and grave provocation. Although the prosecution later lost their appeal for Kwan to be hanged for murder, the Court of Appeal increased Kwan's sentence from ten years to life imprisonment. This appeal later became a landmark in Singaporean legal history in relation to the requirements of successfully raising a defence of sudden and grave provocation against a murder charge in Singapore.

== Stabbing and death ==
On the night of 4 October 1996, while waiting for his girlfriend at a carpark in Yung Kwang Road, 31-year-old Koh Meng Hock (Chinese: 许明发; pinyin: Xǔ Míngfā; Pe̍h-ūe-jī: Khóu Mêng-huak) heard some screams and he was shocked to witness his girlfriend being assaulted by her former boyfriend, who earlier contacted his girlfriend and wanted to meet her at the carpark to return some money to her. While the man fled after Koh went to punch him and save his girlfriend, Koh found out that the man had stabbed his girlfriend. The girlfriend, who was stabbed 14 times with a knife, later died from the brutal stabbing. According to the forensic pathologist Dr Wee Keng Poh, he certified that seven of these wounds to the victim's back and chest were fatal, and these wounds were measured between 8 cm and 10 cm deep.

After stabbing the 23-year-old victim Phang Ai Looi (who was a Perak-born Malaysian), Phang's ex-boyfriend ran off to another building, where he planned to jump down to kill himself, though was too afraid to do so. The ex-boyfriend also tried to hang himself but survived. Throughout the suicide attempts, the police had responded to a report of the stabbing and around 70 officers were deployed to conduct a manhunt for Phang's ex-boyfriend. Eventually, the police discovered the suspect hiding in a water tank of one of the nearby HDB blocks, where the suspect had slit his wrists to try to kill himself, but survived a third time. After a policewoman stepped in and convinced the suspect to give himself up, the suspect agreed to surrender and allowed the police to arrest him for stabbing his girlfriend to death, although he was initially stuck inside the water tank and the police had to help him get out. The knife was also recovered by the police after a search.

On 5 October 1996, the suspect, 29-year-old Malaysian citizen Kwan Cin Cheng, was charged with murder. The charge of murder against Kwan came under Section 302 of the Penal Code, which prescribed the death penalty as the sole punishment for murder. Kwan was remanded for police investigations and pending trial.

== Background ==
Kwan Cin Cheng, who had one brother, was born in 1967 in Ayer Tawar, Perak, Malaysia. He first met his girlfriend Phang Ai Looi, who was a 15-year-old student in 1988, when he was still working as a construction site plasterer in his hometown. They fell in love and dated each other, and when Phang became pregnant the following year, the couple wanted to get married. Phang's father disapproved of Kwan and Phang had to undergo an abortion. The couple also broke up due to Phang's father's disapproval.

In 1992, the couple resumed their relationship and they went to Singapore to work, after Phang completed her Malaysian GCE A-levels. A year later, Phang, then living in Yishun, became pregnant a second time, but her sister paid for an abortion and asked Kwan to not be with her sister. Phang later became pregnant a third time and had another abortion. Still, the couple's relationship was still strong. While working in Singapore, Phang became a Singapore permanent resident.

In July 1995, Phang changed jobs and went to work as a clerk, and she first met Koh Meng Hock, a 31-year-old driver. Phang and Koh gradually became closer, and a month after meeting Koh, Phang began to date Koh despite her existing relationship with Kwan, with whom she still regularly had sex until September 1996. After cheating on Kwan for more than a year, Phang told Kwan that she wanted to end their eight-year long relationship; Kwan responded with shock and sadness, as he still loved Phang and did not want to break up. Phang and Koh even had plans to marry each other in October 1996, the same month Phang was murdered.

== Trial of Kwan Cin Cheng ==
=== Court proceedings and Kwan's defence ===
Kwan Cin Cheng
- Born: Kwan Cin Cheng c. April 1967; Ayer Tawar, Perak, Malaysia
- Occupation: Plasterer (former)
- Parent: Madam Ting (mother)
- Status: Released
- Conviction: Manslaughter (one count)
- Criminal charges: Murder (one count)
- Penalty: Life imprisonment

On 11 April 1997, six months after the murder of Phang Ai Looi, 29-year-old Kwan Cin Cheng stood trial at the High Court for the crime. Kwan was represented by Chua Eng Hui and Leo Cheng Suan, while the prosecution consisted of Christina Koh and Jasbendar Kaur. Judicial Commissioner Amarjeet Singh was the presiding judge of Kwan's trial.

The trial court was told of the long history behind the romantic relationship between Kwan and Phang. While the defence did not dispute the prosecution's contention that Kwan had indeed murdered Phang, their defence was that Kwan had murdered Phang as a result of sudden and grave provocation, and therefore his offence should be manslaughter and not murder. Kwan's testimony revealed that on the night of 4 October 1996, he was in despair over Phang's decision to break up with him and her unfaithfulness, and he went to a supermarket, purchasing two knives, and wanted to kill himself. Kwan still harboured some hope that Phang would come back to him, and he planned to threaten to commit suicide in front of Phang if she refused to go back to him. He contacted Phang under the pretext of returning some money to her, and they met up at a carpark below Kwan's flat in Yung Kwang Road.

However, Phang remained indifferent despite Kwan's suicide threat, and proclaimed that she would not go back to Kwan and wanted to marry Koh Meng Hock. Phang insulted Kwan as a "good-for-nothing" and said that she never cared about Kwan's life and did not care whether he lived or died, since she was much happier with Koh. These words caused Kwan to become wholly enraged, and he used the knife to stab Phang 14 times, causing Phang's death, which was witnessed by Koh. Koh was previously unaware of the relationship between Kwan and Phang, and was also unaware about Phang cheating on Kwan for the whole time he was dating Phang, up until he read about the full details of their relationship in the newspaper. It is unknown how Koh reacted to his late girlfriend's relationship with Kwan and her unfaithfulness to Kwan.

Based on Kwan's account, the defence argued that Kwan, who was known to be a mild mannered and mild tempered man, had killed Phang as a result of grave and sudden provocation, and in view of the long years of romance Kwan had with Phang and their intimacy prior to Phang cheating on Kwan, the verbal insults and remarks that Phang said caused Kwan to become angry losing his rationality and sense of self-control He therefore stabbed Phang to death in such a frenzied state, and with so much force that Kwan's knife was twisted and bent by the time the police recovered it. The defence also drew the court's attention to Kwan's suicide attempts, further stating that Phang's killing was not premeditated and he never intended to kill Phang. The prosecution sought to impeach the defence of sudden and grave provocation, claiming that since the couple were not married and Phang herself already expressed her intention to break-up with Kwan some time prior to the killing, Kwan could not have been sufficiently provoked into killing Phang solely based on her verbal remarks, and he should be found guilty of murder. The prosecution also tried to paint Kwan as a cold-hearted and cruel killer who had a very bad temper.

=== Verdict ===
On 25 April 1997, Judicial Commissioner Amarjeet Singh delivered his verdict.

In his judgement, Judicial Commissioner Singh accepted Kwan's defence of sudden and grave provocation, finding that Kwan was a credible witness and he never planned to commit murder, and he had lost his self-control as a result of what Phang said in the face of Kwan's suicide threat, which was a sufficiently grave and sudden provocation as to cause Kwan to kill Phang in a moment of uncontrollable anger. He also accepted that it was reasonable for Kwan to react in such a way, given that the couple shared a deep and intimate relationship and were as close as a married couple would be. The judge also accepted that Kwan's purpose of bringing the knife was not to commit murder or harm the victim, but to commit suicide should the victim refuse to go back to him. He further found that the provocation from Phang caused Kwan to use the knife to kill her in a spontaneous moment of uncontrollable anger. Therefore, Judicial Commissioner Singh found Kwan not guilty of murder and granted him an acquittal. As Singaporean law prescribed the mandatory death penalty for murder upon conviction, Kwan's acquittal for murder allowed him to escape the death penalty for murdering Phang.

After acquitting Kwan of murder, Judicial Commissioner Singh found Kwan guilty of a lesser offense of culpable homicide not amounting to murder, also known as manslaughter in Singapore's legal terms. The judge sentenced Kwan to ten years in prison for manslaughter, which was punishable by either life imprisonment or up to ten years' jail.

According to the media, Kwan, who celebrated his 30th birthday sometime during the trial, was relieved and he broke down in tears before the prison officers escorted him out of the courtroom. Kwan's 57-year-old mother was relieved to hear the acquittal but, nonetheless, she said her son had to face the consequences for what he had done. Kwan's lawyer Chua Eng Hui also commented that for having killed the person he loved dearly, his client had paid a very heavy price and would have to live with that fact for the rest of his life. Phang's 24-year-old elder sister was saddened to hear the judgement and refused to speak to reporters as she left the courtroom in tears.

A month after Kwan's sentencing, psychiatrists and counsellors were interviewed with regards to the increasing occurrences of crimes of passion, including murder that involved people killing their spouses, lovers or others close to them. They told the papers that crimes of passion were not premeditated or cold-blooded murders because they happened in a spontaneous spur of moment and the killers losing self-control. Kwan's case was cited as the most recent example, due to Kwan being hurt and provoked by Phang's remarks, thus killing her in a moment of loss of self-control due to sudden and grave provocation. Experts also emphasized that crimes of passion, including the murder of Phang, were committed due to the offenders being triggered by words or actions that caused them to be uncontrollably angry, and the offenders of such cases had no intent to cause death or harm; the motive was often due to infidelity, love or possessiveness rather than any premeditated intent to commit these crimes.

== Prosecution's appeal ==
On 19 January 1998, the prosecution's appeal against Kwan's conviction was heard before the Court of Appeal, and the prosecution - consisting of Francis Tseng, Jasbendar Kaur and Christina Koh - sought to have Kwan convicted of murder and sentenced to death, stating that the trial judge was wrong to accept Kwan's defence of sudden and grave provocation and therefore his conviction for manslaughter should be overturned.

After hearing the appeal, the three-judge panel, consisting of Chief Justice Yong Pung How and two Judges of Appeal L P Thean (Thean Lip Ping) and M Karthigesu, swiftly returned with a verdict, which was pronounced in court by CJ Yong. In the verdict, the three judges unanimously ruled that the prosecution's appeal ought to be rejected, while they decided to increase Kwan's jail term of ten years to life imprisonment.

Explaining why they refused to convict Kwan of murder, the appellate judges stated that they agreed with the defence and the original trial judge that based on the long and intimate relationship between Kwan and Phang, which had evolved into a de facto husband-wife relationship, the Phang's insults and malicious words had a grave and extremely provocative impact on Kwan and they would have reasonably caused an individual in Kwan's position to lose his self-control and be overwhelmed with anger, resulting in the murder of Phang. Therefore, the Court of Appeal ruled that Kwan's defence of sudden and grave provocation should be accepted, and they rejected the prosecution's arguments, upholding Kwan's manslaughter conviction.

Aside from dismissing the prosecution's appeal, the Court of Appeal reviewed Kwan's sentence of ten years in jail despite the fact that the prosecution and defence never appealed against Kwan's sentence. The Court of Appeal, after some consideration, determined that Kwan's sentence of ten years was manifestly inadequate due to the fact that Kwan had inflicted extreme violence on a defenceless woman, the grieviousness of Kwan's outburst and his deplorable conduct. The court felt a ten year sentence was too lenient. Therefore, they decided to enhance Kwan's sentence to life imprisonment, the highest punishment stipulated for manslaughter under Singaporean law. Kwan's brother and Phang's father were reportedly present in court to hear the appellate court's verdict.

By the order of Abdul Nasir Amer Hamsah's landmark appeal on 20 August 1997, life imprisonment is to be construed as a jail term lasting the remainder of a convict's natural lifespan, deviating from the old definition of life imprisonment as 20 years' jail. The changes to the law were to be applied to cases that took place after 20 August 1997. Since Kwan committed manslaughter on 4 October 1996, about ten months before the landmark appeal verdict, his life sentence was to be considered as 20 years' imprisonment.

== Aftermath ==
More than a week after her son was given a life sentence for the manslaughter of Phang Ai Looi, Kwan's mother, who introduced herself as Madam Ting, stated that her son had done a very stupid thing for not choosing to simply split with Phang when she had eyes on another man, and she herself never met Phang's parents even though they lived merely two streets away. Madam Ting also stated that unlike Phang's parents, she wanted her son and Phang to get married, and she understood that Phang's remarks about her love for Koh Meng Hock and disregard for Kwan's life must have been so provocative and hurtful that they caused her son to lose his sanity and murder Phang in an uncontrollable state of anger. Phang's parents had once told the press that they never really knew Kwan, and they expressed that they had hoped for Kwan to be hanged for killing their daughter; they were disappointed when Kwan escaped the gallows for murdering Phang.

The prosecution's appeal of Kwan Cin Cheng's case became a landmark case in Singapore's legal history with regards to the defence of sudden and grave provocation, because it clarified that in cases of people who committed murder while under a loss of self-control as attributed to sudden and grave provocation, even verbal remarks could amount to such an extent of provocation with respect to the mental background of the defendant. Therefore, the defence of sudden and grave provocation should be accepted in such cases and should result in a conviction for manslaughter, not murder. The court also stated that the defence was not entitled to alleged killers who were normally bad tempered, but it should be decided whether a normal person was able to retain his self-control in the face of the alleged provocation in order to determine whether the defence of sudden and grave provocation should succeed. In light of this ruling, several precedent cases, such as the Ithinin Kamari case and the K. Vijayan Krishnan case, were recalled and their respective verdicts were cited as examples where a defence of sudden and grave provocation was either accepted or rejected.

In April 1998, the case of Phang Ai Looi's death was re-enacted by Singaporean crime show Crimewatch.

After completing his life sentence by 2016, Kwan had since been released from prison. His current status is unknown.

== See also ==
- Life imprisonment in Singapore
- List of major crimes in Singapore
