= Khoo Teck Puat Hospital shooting =

2015 non-fatal shooting case in Singapore

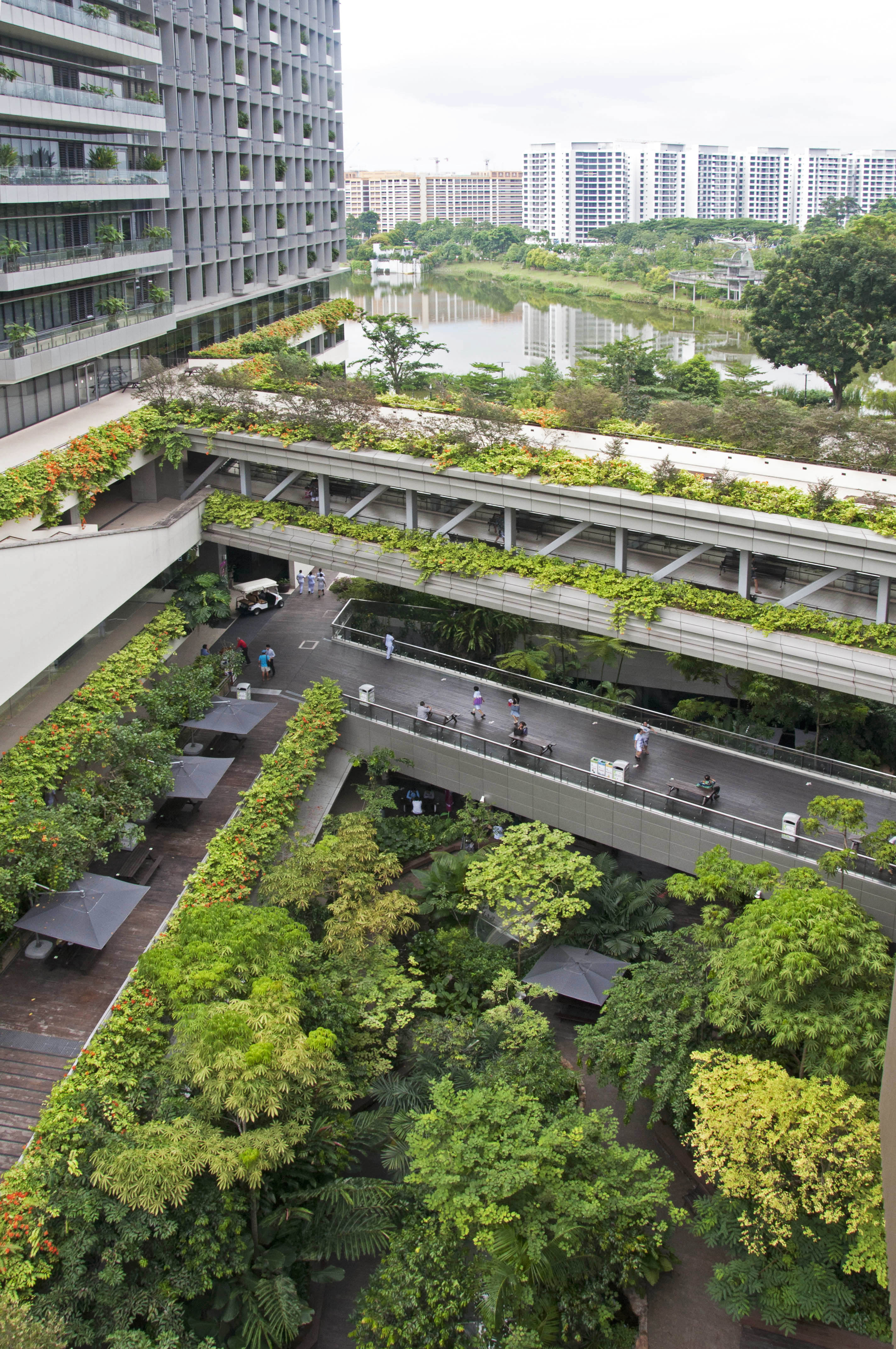
- A link bridge of Khoo Teck Puat Hospital, where the shooting incident took place in one of the hospital wards
- Date: 20 June 2015
- Location: Khoo Teck Puat Hospital, Yishun, Singapore
- Outcome: Iskandar pleading guilty to reduced firearm charge; Iskandar sentenced to life in prison and 18 strokes of the cane; Iskandar imprisoned at Changi Prison since 2015
- Deaths: None
- Injuries: Muhammad Sadli bin Razali (31)
- Convicted: Muhammad Iskandar bin Sa'at (23)
- Verdict: Guilty
- Convictions: Unlawful firearm possession with intent to cause harm to a public servant under the Arms Offences Act
- Sentence: Life imprisonment and 18 strokes of the cane

On 20 June 2015, 23-year-old Muhammad Iskandar bin Sa'at, a former deliveryman who was then in police custody for vehicle theft, was brought to Khoo Teck Puat Hospital in Singapore for treatment of his chest pain. While he was at the hospital, Iskandar attempted to escape by assaulting a police officer, Staff Sergeant (SSGT) Muhammad Sadli bin Razali, and snatched the policeman's revolver and fired three live rounds at the officer, who was injured but survived. Iskandar, who failed to escape, was subsequently arrested and charged with discharging a firearm, an offence that carried the mandatory death penalty under the Arms Offences Act. Later, Iskandar's charge was reduced to possession of a firearm with intent to cause harm, and after he pleaded guilty, Iskandar was sentenced to a mandatory life sentence and 18 strokes of the cane in March 2018.

== Shooting incident ==
On the evening of 20 June 2015, a shooting incident broke out at Khoo Teck Puat Hospital in Yishun, Singapore. While there were no fatalities, a 31-year-old police officer was injured while the suspected shooter, who was a patient in the hospital, was arrested.

According to the media and court documents, the day before the shooting incident, the suspect, a 23-year-old Singaporean deliveryman named Muhammad Iskandar bin Sa'at, was arrested with two others for stealing a lorry at Sembawang, and was charged with the offence the following morning. One of them was Iskandar's pregnant girlfriend, and the other was 24-year-old Muhammad Taufiq bin Jasmi, who was jailed for five months and fined S$800 after he pleaded guilty to the crime. While he was in custody at Ang Mo Kio Police Division for the lorry theft, Iskandar informed the police that he was suffering from chest pains, and asked for a doctor. Therefore, the police decided to bring him to Khoo Teck Puat Hospital to undergo treatment.

After reaching the hospital, Iskandar, escorted by two policemen, was warded in a hospital room reserved for patients under police custody, and was given an intravenous drip (IV drip), and his arms were restrained to the bed. Later, a doctor requested that the restraint on Iskandar's left arm be loosened to allow for blood to be drawn, but after failing for the first time, the doctor left before he would return to try again. One of the officers, Staff Sergeant (SSGT) Muhammad Sadli bin Razali, did not tighten the restraint as he expected the doctor to return for another blood withdrawal attempt. Afterwards, SSGT Sadli left the ward to inquire about Iskandar's treatment, leaving his partner, Sergeant (SGT) Muhammad Fairuz Sutrisno, to guard Iskandar. While SSGT Sadli was away, Iskandar requested to have his right arm restraint loosened as well as he felt discomfort, and SGT Fairuz agreed to do so. In fact, by then, Iskandar had planned to escape.

Without knowing that Iskandar's arm restraints were loosened, SSGT Sadli returned to the room. Later, Iskandar requested for snacks and drinks, and therefore, SGT Fairuz left the hospital ward to get some food, and SSGT Sadli was left alone with Iskandar. Later on, while guarding Iskandar, SSGT Sadli was on his phone at one point, and it was at that point, Iskandar found an opportunity to escape. He used the metal pole used for supporting IV drips to hit SSGT Sadli while the 31-year-old policeman was on the phone, causing SSGT Sadli to be caught by surprise. After doing so, Iskandar tried to leave the ward but SSGT Sadli grabbed ahold of his leg and a scuffle ensued between both men. SSGT Sadli's T-baton was dislodged during the struggle, and Iskandar used it to repeatedly hit the policeman. Iskandar eventually managed to leave the room and headed for a stairwell exit with SSGT Sadli hanging onto his leg, but the door was locked and SSGT Sadli was able to hinder Iskandar's attempt to escape in another direction.

As the struggle grew more intense, Iskandar managed to grab SSGT Sadli's loaded revolver, a .38 Taurus, from the holster. SSGT Sadli pushed Iskandar back into the room and he also pinned Iskandar's hand with the revolver to the ground. At the same time, two paramedics, Prakash Krishnan and Elfredo Jose Jr Rellita Abasolo, witnessed the scuffle and went to SSGT Sadli's aid, and it was at this point, Iskandar discharged the revolver thrice through a pillow, and one of the bullets had hit SSGT Sadli on the foot, and a second live round struck SSGT Sadli on his left thumb, while the third shot missed. After this, three uniformed security officers joined in, and they were able to subdue Iskandar and disarm him. A male doctor also arrived to inject sedatives on Iskandar, therefore ending the scuffle and it led to Iskandar being arrested for the shooting.

Two days after the shooting incident, Home Affairs Minister Teo Chee Hean held a press conference, expressing that unlawful use of firearms was a serious offence in Singapore and the government would not tolerate offenders who commit these crimes. It was also updated that SSGT Sadli was in stable condition after he underwent surgery.

== Criminal charges ==
On 22 June 2015, two days after the shooting, 23-year-old Muhammad Iskandar bin Sa'at was charged with one count of illegally discharging a firearm three times at SSGT Muhammad Sadli bin Razali under Section 4(1) of the Arms Offences Act. If found guilty of this particular offence, Iskandar would be sentenced to death by hanging. Shortly after he was charged, Iskandar was allowed to speak to his brother, sister-in-law and other family members, but he was not granted bail as capital charges did not allow suspects to be released on bail. Not only that, Iskandar's family engaged veteran criminal lawyer Shashi Nathan and his colleague Tania Chin to represent Iskandar during his trial.

A week later, on 29 June 2015, Iskandar was brought back to court to face another two criminal charges. The first was voluntarily causing hurt to a public servant, and the second was attempting to escape from police custody. Subsequently, Iskandar was ordered to be remanded for three weeks at Changi Prison for psychiatric evaluation. The punishment for voluntarily causing hurt to a public servant carried a jail term of up to seven years with a fine or caning, while the penalty for attempted escape from police custody warranted the maximum sentence of 15 years in prison. On 20 July 2015, the remand order was extended by another three weeks.

== Iskandar's trial and sentencing ==
Eventually, after some representations from Iskandar's defence counsel, the prosecution agreed to reduce Iskandar's charge of illegally discharging a firearm to a lesser offence of unlawful possession of a firearm with intent to cause harm to a public servant, which allowed Iskandar to avoid the death penalty. The reduced charge carried a mandatory sentence of life imprisonment and not less than six strokes of the cane. On 19 March 2018, Iskandar officially stood trial at the High Court for the reduced firearm charge. By then, Iskandar offered to plead guilty to the charge against him, and he consented to have the remaining lesser charges - one for stealing a lorry, one for hurting a public servant and another for attempting to escape lawful custody - taken into consideration during sentencing. The trial was presided over by Justice Chan Seng Onn of the High Court.

The prosecution, led by Deputy Public Prosecutor Kelly Ho and Kumarsen Gohulabalan, argued that Iskandar should be given 18 strokes of the cane in addition to a mandatory life term. They stated that this was "one of the worst cases" of violence against police officers, and Iskandar had unleashed wanton violence in a public place and caused huge public disquiet. Therefore, they asked for a deterrent punishment for Iskandar, who would have threatened the safety of medical staff and other patients at the hospital without SSGT Sadli's intervention, and they stated that the officer was fortunate to be alive despite the severe injuries he sustained.

Iskandar's lawyers Shashi Nathan and Tania Chin did not object to the mandatory life sentence, but they asked for between 12 and 15 strokes of the cane, and stated that leniency should be given on account of Iskandar's acceptance of full responsibility and remorse, and Iskandar had no intention of shooting and hurting SSGT Sadli, since he only wanted to escape and due to the fact that Iskandar's mother was sick at the time and that his girlfriend, who was caught for stealing a lorry with him, was pregnant, Iskandar wanted to escape to see them and to explain himself to his parents and girlfriend's family. Nathan also added that having injected himself with heroin 27 hours before the arrest, Iskandar suffered from drug withdrawal symptoms and it also exacerbated his panic and impulsive behaviour that resulted in him getting involved in the shooting and escape attempt.

On the same date, after closing submissions were completed, 26-year-old Muhammad Iskandar bin Sa'at was sentenced to life imprisonment and 18 strokes of the cane. In his oral sentencing remarks, Justice Chan stated that Iskandar had committed an extremely serious offence and Iskandar's actions also carried the high possibility of causing serious harm, and hence he found it appropriate to sentence Iskandar to life in prison and 18 strokes of the cane as what the prosecution requested. Nonetheless, Iskandar's family members, who were present in court, were relieved at the sentence and Iskandar himself also broke down in relief at the sentence. Nathan also expressed his gratitude to the prosecution for having agreed to reduce the original charge against Iskandar after they carefully considered the circumstances behind the case, allowing Iskandar to be spared the gallows.

Iskandar, who did not appeal, is currently serving his life sentence at Changi Prison since the end of his trial. Although life imprisonment was meant to be a term of incarceration for the rest of one's natural life, Iskandar was entitled to the possibility of release on parole after completing at least 20 years of his jail term, provided that he served his sentence with good behaviour.

== Response ==
The shooting incident, which shocked the nation, prompted a discussion in the Parliament of Singapore. Home Affairs Minister Teo Chee Hean responded during the session that an independent review panel to investigate the Khoo Teck Puat Hospital shooting, and he assured that the police were adhering to the escort procedures. There were also proposals to review the safety and security protocols of police officers escorting suspects to hospital, and the Singapore Police Force's Internal Affairs Office also investigated for possible negligence of duty by the officers involved in the incident. Second Minister for Home Affairs Masagos Zulkifli similarly expressed that the investigations of the shooting could help identify any problems and the corrective actions required in the future.

The shooting case also led to national newspaper The Straits Times to interview former and current policemen about the general procedures of drawing firearms in situations similar to Iskandar's case. The case also attracted huge public attention, and Mothership also clarified public misconceptions that Iskandar would not face the death penalty, stating that while there was a possibility that Iskandar's charge could be modified, he would be sentenced to the mandatory death penalty under the Arms Offences Act if found guilty of the original charge, a fate which Iskandar ultimately evaded.

The Khoo Teck Puat shooting also recalled several past cases of suspects who snatched the guns of policemen while resisting arrest (including cop-killer Ong Yeow Tian), as well as some high-profile gun crimes (including the Tan Chor Jin case) that occurred over the previous few years in Singapore, where gun violence was extremely rare.

== See also ==
- Arms Offences Act
- Caning in Singapore
- Life imprisonment in Singapore
- Capital punishment in Singapore
- List of major crimes in Singapore
