= Killing of Zabelle Peh =

2023 abuse and killing of a 2-month-old girl in Sembawang, Singapore

Zabelle Peh
- Born: Zabelle Peh Yu Xuan; 6 November 2022; Singapore
- Died: 13 January 2023 (aged 0); Sembawang, Singapore
- Cause of death: Death via fractured skull
- Known for: Possible abuse and murder victim
- Parent(s): Peh Wei Jian (father), Sim Liang Xiu (mother)

On 8 January 2023, inside her flat in Sembawang, Singapore, a two-month-old baby girl named Zabelle Peh Yu Xuan (Chinese: 白雨萱; Pe̍h-ōe-jī: Pe̍h Hō͘-soan; pinyin: Bái Yǔxuān) was assaulted and deliberately dropped into a cot, which fractured her skull. Peh's biological parents, Sim Liang Xiu (Chinese: 沈靓秀; Pe̍h-ōe-jī: Sím Chēng-siù; pinyin: Shěn Liàngxiù) and Peh Wei Jian (Chinese: 白伟健; Pe̍h-ōe-jī: Pe̍h Úi-kiān; pinyin: Bái Wěijiàn), were arrested days after the assault and charged with voluntarily causing grievous hurt and child abuse respectively, and the alleged offenders and victim were originally not publicly named in the media due to a gag order.

Zabelle died from her injuries on 13 January 2023 after the indictment of her parents. The gag order was then lifted and Sim had her original charge upgraded to murder, while Peh himself faced a fresh charge of failing to protect his daughter and allowed her death.

In April 2025, Sim was convicted of manslaughter and sentenced to eight years in prison, while Peh was given seven years' jail for not protecting his daughter from child abuse.

== Abuse of baby and indictment ==
On 16 January 2023, it was reported that a 31-year-old man and a 29-year-old woman, both residing at a flat in Sembawang, were charged two days before with the abuse of a two-month-old girl, who was discovered with a fractured skull.

Based on court documents and media reports, the woman was charged with voluntarily causing grievous hurt while the man was charged with the ill-treatment of the child. One documented instance of the abuse happened on 5 January 2023, when the man allegedly slapped the infant's face, who was under his custody, at about 1.30am. Another instance happened on the night of 8 January 2023, when the female offender allegedly caused grievous hurt to the baby by forcefully dropping her down in the cot, which caused the girl's skull to become fractured. Under unspecified circumstances, the incidents of abuse came to light and it led to the arrest and indictment of the pair. The pair were scheduled to undergo psychiatric evaluation at the Institute of Mental Health on 27 January. The female offender faced the maximum sentence of ten years' jail with caning for causing grievous hurt, although women cannot be caned; while the woman's male accomplice faced the maximum sentence of eight years' jail and/or a S$8,000 fine for ill-treating a child.

Although the relationship between the girl and the alleged offenders were not revealed in court at first, local Chinese newspapers confirmed that the alleged abusers of the baby were her biological parents. At the time of the indictment, the identities of the victim and her parents were withheld to protect the child, whose condition at that point was not revealed to the public.

== Death of Zabelle and new charges ==
Sometime after her parents were charged with abusing Zabelle, she eventually succumbed to her injuries, and died on 13 January 2023.

As a result of her death, on 3 February 2023, Zabelle's 29-year-old mother Sim Liang Xiu was brought back to court, and her original charge of causing grievous hurt was amended to murder, a capital offence that carries either the death penalty or life imprisonment with caning if found guilty, although caning would not be imposed in cases of women convicted of murder but gets life in lieu of death. Additionally, the gag order on the identities of Sim and Zabelle were lifted due to the victim's death. Sim reportedly asked the court why she had to be further investigated, stating there was no point in doing so since she was already "guilty" of murdering her daughter per the police's contention, and the district court judge reminded Sim that the offence she was charged for was a serious one and the investigations had to be fully completed in view of the nature of her offence. A week later, Sim returned to court, and the police confirmed that an autopsy report from the Health Sciences Authority (HSA) was still pending at that point. Sim remained in remand since as murder suspects facing the death penalty were not allowed to receive bail. Sim was also set to return to the crime scene to re-enact the murder.

A 2012 news report revealed that prior to the murder of her daughter, Sim, then 18 years old, was previously charged for causing hurt to a police sergeant at Paya Lebar. It was reported that Sim had kicked Sergeant Siti Sharina Mohd Jailani inside the bus at the area and even hurled expletives at her over a supposed report about Sim's EZ-Link card, and Sim reportedly expressed her intention to plead guilty, although the outcome and sentencing in that particular case was not specified. Prior to the case, Sim's husband was previously married in 2012 before he registered his marriage with Sim in 2018.

On 6 February 2023, Zabelle's 31-year-old father Peh Wei Jian returned to court, and aside from his original charge of ill-treating Zabelle, he faced a new charge under the Children and Young Persons Act, and the charge itself was pertaining to him not protecting his daughter and allowed the death of the girl in the same household; the gag order on Peh's identity was similarly removed due to his daughter's death. Peh was remanded for a week to assist in investigations. For the new charge of allowing the baby's death, Peh faced the maximum sentence of 20 years' jail with either a fine or caning. In another court appearance on 13 March, Peh reportedly told the district court that he was not at the scene of crime when the fatal assault happened, and he claimed he had tried to stop his wife from beating the child, although the judge prohibited him from saying further to interfere with the court proceedings and fairness of investigations. Peh's next court appearance was set in July of that same year. Reportedly, Peh was reportedly offered a S$100,000 bail, and a court order also restricted him from coming into contact with Zabelle's 16-month-old elder brother.

== 2025 trial and sentencing ==
=== Plea of guilt ===
On 2 April 2025, more than two years after the death of Zabelle Peh, her parents stood trial for her killing and abuse.

Zabelle's mother Sim Liang Xiu, then 31 years old, pleaded guilty to a reduced charge of culpable homicide not amounting to murder, equivalent to manslaughter in Singapore law. Sim's original murder charge was downgraded to manslaughter after pre-trial psychiatric evaluations determined that Sim was suffering from postpartum depression, which affected her mental responsibility at the time of the offence. Zabelle's father, 34-year-old Peh Wei Jian, pleaded guilty to one count of failing to protect his daughter from abuse.

=== Account of the killing and abuse ===
During the court proceedings, the full account of the abuse leading to Zabelle's death was revealed in court.

Soon after her birth on 16 November 2022, Zabelle was subjected to extensive abuse by her mother, and these include acts of slapping the girl and biting the baby's forearm, and based on the couple's text messages adduced in court, Peh had told Sim several times to try not to hit the child, although he himself also participated in the abuse by forcefully pushing the tip of a milk bottle into the baby’s mouth and throwing her into a cot out of other acts.

On 8 January 2023, Sim became upset with Zabelle for soiling herself, and it drove her to throw the baby down into the cot. The next day, Peh discovered that Zabelle was unresponsive after he gave her a bath. The couple called the ambulance, but they lied to the paramedics that the girl become unresponsive after she fell from a bed, so as to avoid being detected for abusing the child. The paramedics conducted CPR to resuscitate the girl before bringing her to Khoo Teck Puat Hospital (KTPH). Zabelle was subsequently transferred to the intensive care unit at KK Women's and Children's Hospital.

Medical screening reports by doctors found that Zabelle suffered from old injuries of acute chest infection and deformity of her left upper arm bone, which Peh claimed to be caused by a fall in the shower. Additional reports indicated that Zabelle had several areas of bleeding in her brain, a healed rib fracture, a healed fracture in her left upper arm, and new bone growth in her right upper arm, which could suggest a previous injury. Zabelle would die five days after the fatal abuse, and her parents were arrested on 12 January 2023. An autopsy report confirmed that Zabelle died as a result of a fatal skull fracture.

=== Sentencing ===
On that same day, the prosecution and defence made their final submissions on sentence. The prosecution urged the court to sentence Sim to between eight and nine years in prison and seven to eight years for Peh, citing the cruelty of the abuse and additionally argued that Sim's psychiatric condition should not be an excuse for her actions of harming and killing her daughter, and hence deterrence and retribution should be prioritized in calibrating her punishment. Sim's lawyer, Manoj Nandwani, did not oppose to the prosecution's request on sentence but emphasized that Sim was remorseful of her actions and she had a history of depression. On the other hand, Peh's lawyer, Ng Yuan Siang, asked for a sentence of three to four years' jail, as Peh tried to stop the abuse and he himself was also abused by Sim occasionally.

After receiving the submissions, the trial judge, Justice Dedar Singh Gill, sentenced Sim to eight years' imprisonment and Peh to seven years' imprisonment. Justice Gill quoted that it was "difficult for a sentient person to fathom the cruelty inflicted on Zabelle", and while he accepted that Sim was remorseful and took into account her depression, Justice Gill rejected Ng's attempt to downplay Peh's responsibility, pointing out that Peh had voluntarily took part in the abuse of the girl and except for verbally advising Sim against abusing their daughter, Peh never took any meaningful steps to put a stop to the abuse, and it was "manifestly inadequate" to give Peh three to four years' jail as requested by the defence, as it did not represent the seriousness of the offence and its aggravating factors.

== Case response ==
When the death of Zabelle was first reported in the media, many neighbours of the couple in Sembawang were shocked to hear about what happened. One of the neighbours, a 30-year-old housewife, told the press that she remembered the couple moving in to their block while Sim was heavily pregnant and she gave birth not long after; she described Sim as a housewife who stayed at home all the time while Peh often worked in shifts. Another neighbour, a man in his 60s, stated that the couple, who were normally "quiet people", had once gave him and the other neighbours some cakes to celebrate their baby reaching a full month old, which made him shocked and surprised to realize that the baby had died. Reporters exploring the couple's flat also witnessed a new bicycle and a bag of new toys being left outside the doorstep, which were presumably left behind by someone offering condolences to the late two-month-old Zabelle.

Peh Wei Jian was the third person to be charged under Section 304C of the Penal Code for allowing the death of a child under the same household, and the only person in 2023 to be indicted for such offences under the Penal Code.

In light of the 2025 sentencing of the abusers of Megan Khung, a four-year-old girl abused to death by her mother and her mother's boyfriend, the death of Zabelle Peh was recalled as one of at least eight most high-profile cases of child abuse resulting in death that happened in Singapore between 2015 and 2023.

== See also ==
- Death of Megan Khung
- Yishun infant murder
- 2020 Jurong child killing
- Chin Swee Road child death
- 2016 Toa Payoh child abuse case
- List of major crimes in Singapore
