= Death of Mohamad Daniel Mohamad Nasser =

2015 case of a boy abused to death in Singapore

Mohamad Daniel Mohamad Nasser
- Mohamad Daniel Mohamad Nasser, who died after 25 days of torture
- Born: Mohamad Daniel bin Mohamad Nasser c. December 2012; Singapore
- Died: 23 November 2015 (aged 2); Telok Blangah Crescent, Singapore
- Cause of death: Fatal head injury
- Known for: Child abuse victim
- Parents: Mohamad Nasser Abdul Gani (father); Zaidah (mother)

On 23 November 2015, after being severely assaulted by his mother and her boyfriend the day before, Mohamad Daniel Mohamad Nasser, who was a month short of his third birthday, died at his mother's rented flat in Telok Blangah Crescent. Daniel sustained about 41 external injuries caused by abuse. Investigations and sources revealed that the couple had often beaten the boy, told him to stand in the living room or kitchen for hours as punishment, and force-fed him dry chilli. This abuse lasted for a month or so before Daniel died from a head injury inflicted by the couple.

Daniel's biological mother, 41-year-old Zaidah (who goes by one name), and her 46-year-old boyfriend Zaini Jamari were arrested and put on trial in June 2016 for the fatal abuse of the boy. The couple were both found guilty of multiple counts of causing grievous hurt and child abuse, and a month later, Zaidah was handed a jail term of 11 years while Zaini was given ten years' imprisonment and 12 strokes of the cane.

The brutality of the case brought shock to the whole of Singapore and led to calls for greater involvement from the community to prevent child abuse, and together with several other high-profile cases of abused vulnerable persons, the death of Daniel prompted the government to introduce harsher laws in 2018 to curb child abuse, which included the judges' discretion to enhance the punishment of offenders who commit crimes against vulnerable people (including the elderly, domestic maids and young children).

== Background ==
Mohamad Daniel Mohamad Nasser, a Singaporean, was born in December 2012. Daniel's parents married in early 2012 at Batam, Indonesia. However, the marriage was short-lived, because during that same year, Daniel's biological father Mohamad Nasser Abdul Gani discovered that his wife was having an affair, and this led to a divorce after a few months of marriage. Unknown to Nasser at that stage, his ex-wife Zaidah, a cleaner who goes by one name, was already pregnant with Daniel, who was born a month after Nasser was sent to prison for drug offences. Nasser, who was sentenced to 18 months' jail for drug abuse in December 2012, was only notified of Daniel's existence when an officer brought him a document to acknowledge his relation to Daniel. Nasser was released in June 2014, and tried to search for his son, but his search lasted for at least a year and he never found his son.

Sources revealed that before her short-lived marriage to Nasser, Zaidah was married to another person in 1991 before it ended for unknown reasons. Daniel was Zaidah's fourth child, and her three older children from her first marriage did not live with Zaidah. After her second marriage to Daniel's father ended, Zaidah began a relationship with a cleaner named Zaini Jamari, and she gave birth to a daughter (Zaidah's fifth child) in March 2015. As of November 2015, Zaidah was pregnant with her sixth child. Both Zaidah and Zaini were previously convicted and jailed for various offences, including morphine abuse, housebreaking and theft.

At the time he was one month old, Daniel and his mother were living in a cramped storeroom at an industrial building in Ubi Road. When he was one month old, in January 2013, Daniel was entrusted to the care of his first caregiver Masita Hussin, who agreed to take care of Daniel, and she would went on to care for the boy for two years and seven months, before another caregiver Yusnita Mohamed Idrus would take over. During the time when Daniel was living with Masita, Zaidah and her boyfriend were both renting a flat at Telok Blangah. Zaidah would visit her son about once a month and also would pay Masita about S$250 for taking care of her son, but her weekly visits and payments were often irregular. In mid-October 2015, Daniel returned to live with his mother at the Telok Blangah flat she rented, after Yusnita could not continue to caregive Daniel due to her needing to receive an operation.

== Abuse and death ==
From 18 October 2015 to 22 November 2015, over a period of 25 days, two-year-old Mohamad Daniel Mohamad Nasser was subjected to cruel and sadistic physical torture by his mother Zaidah and her boyfriend Zaini Jamari.

Although the couple's motive behind the abuse was never known, sources revealed that Zaidah and Zaini kicked and slapped Daniel daily and often required him to stand with his hands on his head while wearing only a nappy as punishment, and of these instances of abuse, several were recounted in detail from the court documents and media covering the case. On one occasion, on 21 October 2015, Daniel was punished for unspecified reasons and told to stand beside a fan as punishment. When the boy grew sleepy and could not stand straight, Zaidah was angered and slapped him in the face several times, scolding him in Malay for not wanting to sleep in the night while choosing to sleep during the day. When Daniel fell, Zaidah kicked her son in the stomach, before she grabbed his hand and pulled him up, ordering him to stand in the kitchen. On another occasion on 9 November 2015, Zaidah forcefully kicked her son on the back while he was seen standing with his hands on his head, and she proceeded to kick her son on the ribs with great force, and this incident had similarly occurred once again six days later on 15 November 2015. Three days later, on 18 November 2015, Zaidah beaten up her son by repeatedly hitting him on the face and chest, so much so with great force that Daniel fell and his mouth had bled.

On 22 November 2015, the day before Daniel died, 41-year-old Zaidah, who was then pregnant with her sixth child, tried to feed Daniel breakfast but after the boy refused to eat, Zaidah angrily slapped him in the face thrice, and both Zaidah and her boyfriend slapped Daniel repeatedly. Daniel fell down due to the beatings, but Zaidah remained undeterred and continued to abuse her son by stamping on her son's chest with her leg before she pulled him up by his arm. Later that evening, Daniel was told to stand near a fan as a punishment. Daniel, who was exhausted, rested his hand on a bed frame but the couple spotted this and they both slapped him. Subsequently, Daniel laid down on the floor and closed his eyes, and Zaini caught sight of this and hence force-fed the boy two spoonfuls of dried chilli. Zaini forcibly brought Daniel to the toilet, washed his mouth and ordered Daniel to stand in the living room.

Shortly after this, Daniel appeared faint and the couple mercilessly battered the boy once again. Daniel was being slapped and also kicked onto the chest and stomach, and during this particular assault, Daniel's head hit the ground and sustained a head injury. Zaidah later passed Zaini some dried chilli and he forced it down the boy's throat until mucus came out of Daniel's nose. After the brutal abuse, Zaini took Daniel to the toilet and washed his face, and put him to bed thereafter. This time round, the assault proved fatal, as Daniel died during his sleep. His death was only discovered the next morning on 23 November 2015, when the couple were unable to wake him up at around 8am. Zaidah's landlady and her niece, who were also at the flat itself, called the ambulance despite the couple's attempt to stop them both, and the paramedics arrived soon after, tending to Daniel before he was pronounced dead at 9am, after they found that there was no heartbeat. An autopsy was conducted on Daniel, and it was found that he sustained about 41 external injuries all over his body; the forensic report also certified that Daniel's head injury was the cause of his death, as there was bleeding in the brain.

== Legal process and sentence ==
=== Arrest and plea of guilt ===
Zaidah, Daniel's mother who was sentenced to the harsher penalty of 11 years' jail for her greater culpability behind her son's death.

Zaini Jamari, Zaidah's boyfriend who was sentenced to ten years' jail and 12 strokes of the cane for joining in the fatal abuse of Daniel.

When the police was first involved in the case, both Zaidah and Zaini Jamari lied to the police that Daniel had a habit of pinching himself and inflicting self-harm, and even lied that he accidentally fell and hurt his head. However, through further investigations, the police, by unspecified means, managed to discover that Zaidah and Zaini were responsible for abusing and murdering Daniel, and hence, the couple were arrested on suspicion of killing the boy and charged in court.

On 23 June 2016, the couple were brought to trial at a district court, not for murder (which carried the death penalty) but for lesser charges of voluntarily causing grievous hurt. Principal District Judge Bala Reddy presided over the hearing, in which the couple each pleaded guilty in court to one count of voluntarily causing grievous hurt to Daniel under Section 322 of the Penal Code, and three counts of ill-treating him under the Children and Young Persons Act. 41-year-old Zaidah also faced 26 additional counts of child abuse while 46-year-old Zaini also faced another 18 counts of child abuse for mistreating Daniel. The couple's sentencing trial was scheduled to take place on 5 July 2015.

In their final submissions on sentence, the prosecution sought at least nine years' jail and caning between nine to 12 strokes for Zaini, and they also called for Zaidah to serve at least ten years, which included a 12-month incarceration period in lieu of caning due to the law prohibiting women from being caned. Deputy Public Prosecutor (DPP) Claire Poh highlighted the multiple aggravating factors behind the crime, stating that Daniel was a vulnerable victim who did not have the maturity and physical strength to protect himself and could not escape the flat and abuse. DPP Poh argued in her submissions that Daniel, given his young and vulnerable age, should be nurtured in a safe and secure environment at the very sancity called home, and in contrast to this expectation, his living conditions were as harsh and inhumane as those of a "concentration camp". The prosecutor also pointed out that another aggravating factor was that both the accused harboured a "callous lack of remorse" for their actions, reasons behind which they did not account for and they were also viewing the boy's plight with "cool indifference", given that they consciously lied to paramedics and police that the injuries were accidental and self-inflicted by Daniel.

During the submissions stage, the trial judge noted that the couple showed no emotion when viewing the photographs and CCTV footage capturing the horrific signs of abuse on Daniel, which was a testament to their lack of remorse. The couple reportedly took the chance to ask for a lighter sentence, although it was not confirmed if they were represented by counsel during the proceedings. For the most serious charge of causing grievous hurt, the couple faced the maximum sentence of ten years' imprisonment, plus a possible fine or caning. For each count of ill-treatment of a child, it warranted the maximum penalty of four years in jail and/or a fine of up to S$4,000 per charge.

=== Sentencing of the couple ===
On 5 July 2016, Principal District Judge Bala Reddy delivered his decision on sentence. Before passing sentence, District Judge Reddy admonished the couple for their ruthless and callous conduct, and for their lack of remorse. He found that the abusive acts committed against Daniel amounted to "senseless brutality" and stated that a young child like Daniel did not deserve to be treated with abuse and pain "at the hands of the very persons who should have been his source of support, comfort and happiness". District Judge Reddy also briefly summed up that for having prematurely and mercilessly ended the life of two-year-old Mohamad Daniel Mohamad Nasser with extreme violence and unrelenting cruelty, a harsh sentence was warranted to correspond with the cold-blooded nature of the crime.

In particular, District Judge Reddy turned his attention to Zaidah's conduct, condemning her for committing such a heinous crime towards her own son as the victim's biological mother in this case, and he quoted:

"The idea of a mother causing such grievous hurt and ill-treatment of the baby she had carried for nine months is simply incomprehensible."

As such, in the case of Zaidah, District Judge Reddy imposed the following sentences:

1. Nine years' imprisonment for the first count of voluntarily causing grievous hurt to Daniel under Section 322 of the Penal Code. (consecutive)
2. Two years' jail for the first count of child abuse under the Children and Young Persons Act (CYPA). (consecutive)
3. Two years' jail for the second count of child abuse under the Children and Young Persons Act (CYPA). (concurrent)
4. Two years' jail for the third count of child abuse under the Children and Young Persons Act (CYPA). (concurrent)

As for Zaini, District Judge Reddy handed out the sentences as listed below:

1. Eight-year jail term and 12 strokes of the cane for the first count of voluntarily causing grievous hurt to Daniel under Section 322 of the Penal Code. (consecutive)
2. Two years' jail for the first count of child abuse under the Children and Young Persons Act (CYPA). (consecutive)
3. Two years' jail for the second count of child abuse under the Children and Young Persons Act (CYPA). (concurrent)
4. Two years' jail for the third count of child abuse under the Children and Young Persons Act (CYPA). (concurrent)

In total, 41-year-old Zaidah would spend 11 years in jail while 46-year-old Zaini Jamari received a total of ten years' imprisonment and 12 strokes of the cane. As Zaidah was not given caning due to her gender, her jail term of 11 years also included a period of 12 months in replacement of caning. The couple reportedly showed no emotion when the sentence was passed.

== Case response ==
=== Response of family, friends and neighbours ===
In the aftermath of the couple's conviction and sentence for the fatal abuse of Daniel, his biological father Mohamad Nasser Abdul Gani was interviewed by the media, and he told the reporters that it was an anguish for him to sit in court and hear how his son was being abused daily, and imagining the predicament Daniel was in during the final days of his life. Nasser said that he was unable to forgive his ex-wife and her boyfriend for killing his son, and he stated that when he first heard about the birth of his son, whose existence he was unaware of until the prison officer broke the news to him, he strived to turn over a new leaf for his son and wanted to be a good father to the boy whom he never got to meet until the news of his death came a year after Nasser began to search for his son and ex-wife, which was an emotional blow for him. Nasser only got to see and touch his son for the first time at the mortuary, and he and Daniel's paternal relatives conducted the funeral for Daniel, who was buried at Lim Chu Kang Muslim Cemetery on 30 November 2015.

Coincidentally, the date of his ex-wife's sentencing was also the date of Nasser's 42nd birthday, and when Nasser heard the sentence, he was devastated and broke down, because he felt the sentences were too light in view of his son's death, and Nasser stated that nothing could bring back his son regardless of the punishment, as the couple would get a chance of freedom while his son never had a chance to come out from the grave again. Nasser's 48-year-old brother Abdu Manaf Al Ansari (the oldest of Nasser's four siblings), who was also present at the courtroom, was similarly unhappy with the sentence and planned to engage a lawyer to represent their family in writing to the Attorney-General's Chambers (AGC) to review the couple's sentences.

Masita Hussin, Daniel's 51-year-old caregiver, agreed to be interviewed by reporters to speak her side of the story. Masita told the press that she began taking care of Daniel when he was a month-old baby, and described him as a "happy child". Masita, who had three children (aged between 19 and 29 years old) and a two-year-old grandson, revealed that she grew to love Daniel like her own child after growing close to him, and Daniel, who likewise became closely-bonded to Masita, often called her "Ibu", which meant mother in Malay. Masita was saddened to see Daniel go when his mother took him away to take care of him on her own, and she lost contact of Daniel's mother, who changed her address and contact details, and through the help of Daniel's new caregiver Yusnita Mohamed Idrus (aged 41 in 2016), Masita was able to secretly reunite with Daniel in September 2015. Masita's 21-year-old second son Irwan Shah Kasim also told the reporters that he had to carry out the sad task of notifying his mother about Daniel's death, after the boy's caregiver called to inform him about his death at the hands of Zaidah and her boyfriend, and the news broke Masita's heart. After the sentencing of Zaidah and Zaini, Masita, who reportedly cannot forgive the couple for killing Daniel, felt that the verdict was unsatisfactory, and she wanted to make use of the Hari Raya season to mourn for Daniel and visit his grave at Lim Chu Kang Muslim Cemetery.

The newspapers also reached out to Zaidah's 51-year-old friend Puspawati Abdul Razat, who was the owner of Zaidah's Telok Blangah Crescent flat and lived there with her 15-year-old niece, Daniel, the couple and their one-year-old daughter (Daniel's half-sister). Puspawati recounted her sadness for Daniel and the horrific mistreatment she witnessed happening on Daniel, whom she shared a close bond and treated like a grandson. Puspawati told the press that she had tried numerous times to stop the couple from abusing Daniel, but her efforts were fruitless and her advice often fell on deaf ears, and she was unable to do more to intervene given that she was unable to walk, and she even fell down on one occasion while trying to shield Daniel from the abuse. The couple were unrelenting in the face of Puspawati's intervention and retorted that she should mind her own business. Puspawati described Daniel as a "brave" boy who did not cry even when he was repeatedly battered by his mother and/or Zaini.

Puspawati regretted renting her flat to Zaidah, as she felt that she should have known her true colours and also regretted that she did not do more to help Daniel, and felt partly responsible for Daniel's death, but she also feared for her safety should she reported the couple - who were always at her home - to the police and they might possibly harm her out of revenge. Puspawati added that even after killing Daniel, the couple tried stopping Puspawati and her niece from calling the ambulance to no avail, and they even coldly watched television without shedding a tear for Daniel, after they completed their statements to the police and paramedics by blatantly lying that Daniel got injured falling down and pinching himself.

Neighbours of the couple were similarly shocked and saddened by the death of Daniel. Notably, none of the neighbours (most of whom were tenants renting the units) were aware of the abuse which Daniel had undergone during the final 35 days of his life, as they rarely heard a child crying or sounds of abuse coming from the flat, and some of them stated they did not act immediately as they did not want to be labelled as a "kaypoh" or busybody in Hokkien. In fact, Daniel's case was the second case of child abuse to happen in that same block of flats in Telok Blangah Crescent; three years prior to Daniel's death, a young girl was physically abused by her mother's boyfriend for over a month. The offender, Mohammad Rudy Johan, was jailed for four years and given four strokes of the cane in 2013 after pleading guilty to hurting the girl and was assumed to be released soon at this point.

=== Public response and outcry ===
When the case first came to light, the tragic abuse and death of Daniel shocked the nation, and it was shocking to the extent that several outraged netizens created a petition to the courts, calling for the couple to receive the death penalty for murder as they felt that sending the mother and her boyfriend to jail with caning was overtly lenient. Many more netizens also expressed sadness and sympathy for the boy after the story of the child became widely circulated on social media, in addition to the anger and condemnation the public harboured towards the couple and the abhorrent nature of their crimes. The case of Daniel's death also raised the awareness of the phenomenon of family violence in Singapore, and it was noted that in 2015, the Child Protective Service (CPS) investigated 551 cases of severe child abuse cases out of the 2,200 reports it received, which was an increase of about 40 per cent in such cases compared to the period between 2012 and 2014.

In 2025, after the sentencing of Foo Li Ping and her boyfriend for abusing and killing her daughter Megan Khung, the 2015 death of Mohamad Daniel was listed as one of at least eight most high-profile cases of child abuse resulting in death that happened in Singapore between 2015 and 2023.

=== Government response ===
In June 2016, Minister of Social and Family Development (MSF) Tan Chuan-Jin, who noted the tragic circumstances and severity of the case, called for all Singaporeans to be more mindful of possible signs of child abuse from their neighbours, which could help prevent and deter more future cases with similar outcomes as the case of Daniel's death. Tan also reiterated the same stance again in November of that same year, and also set up a three-year campaign aimed at creating more awareness about family violence.

In July 2016, the same month when the sentencing of the child abusers took place, Law Minister K. Shanmugam brought attention to the "heartbreaking" case of Daniel's murder, stating that the government would be looking into possible reviews of the current legal framework to ensure more adequate punishments for similar cases of child abuse where the victims died.

== Legal impact ==
In July 2018, more than two years after the death of Mohamad Daniel Mohamad Nasser, Law Minister K. Shanmugam announced that there would be new changes made to the law, which introduced a new sentencing framework that allow judges in Singapore to enhance the pre-existing sentences for offences against vulnerable victims, including young children, foreign maids and the elderly, and cases like the deaths of Daniel and Annie Ee were among the precedent cases that prompted the need for the government to introduce tougher measures to deter crimes against vulnerable individuals in Singapore's society.

Not only that, the government also planned to introduce a new criminal offence under Section 304C of the Penal Code, which dictates that anyone who abused their victim over a prolonged period of time until the victim died should be given up to 20 years' jail with possible caning or fine. The government, in reaffirming their stance in September of that same year, also stated that it was often difficult in cases of child abuse to prove an offender guilty of manslaughter at least, in view of insufficient evidence to proceed with such charges, and it was the normal practice to prosecute the offender for causing grievous hurt, which carried less severe punishments than manslaughter, but the government also stated that an offender who intentionally abused a child to the point of death was no less culpable than one who committed manslaughter. The changes also included greater protection of minors, abolition of immunity in marital rape and decriminalize attempted suicide. These new laws were eventually passed in early 2019.

The case of Daniel's death was again mentioned in 2024 when the offence of allowing the death of a child by abuse once again became a topic of public discussion, and the offence was used to convict a person of child abuse whenever more than one person was involved but with uncertainty of whoever was more culpable, so as to deter such crimes and punish parents who could have had the ability to prevent the abuse of their child or children but chose to not do so. It was often noted that in such cases, a biological parent or step-parent was involved whenever two or more were facing charges for child abuse that resulted in death. More frequently, the parent who allowed the death was overwhelmingly a woman. Experts and welfare individuals stated that the females would often hesitate to step in whenever these instances of abuse happened, as the women would fear retaliation or further violence may come down on themselves or their children and they also feared that their children would be removed from the household if reports of the abuse was lodged. As of 2024, there was one conviction made for the crime of allowing a child's death by abuse; Roslinda Jamil was the first to be found guilty of allowing her second husband to abuse her 11-year-old daughter from her first marriage, for which the abusive acts resulted in the death of Roslinda's daughter.

== See also ==
- 1999 Ang Mo Kio child abuse case
- Death of Mohammad Airyl Amirul Haziq Mohamed Ariff
- Death of Annie Ee
- 2016 Toa Payoh child abuse case
- Murder of Nursabrina Agustiani Abdullah
- List of major crimes in Singapore
- Caning in Singapore
