= Ayeesha =

Ayeesha is a given name and may refer to:

- Ayeesha Aiman, born 1996, Indian actress
- Ayeesha child abuse case, 2012 – 2017, Singaporean child abuse victim
