= Killing of Megan Khung =

2020 case of a young girl in Singapore

Megan Khung
- Born: Megan Khung Yu Wai; 4 October 2015; Singapore
- Died: 21 February 2020 (aged 4); Lim Ah Woo Road, Paya Lebar, Singapore
- Cause of death: Murdered
- Known for: Murder victim
- Parent(s): Simon Khung (father), Foo Li Ping (mother)

Megan Khung Yu Wai (Note: Chinese: 江雨惠; pinyin: Jiāng Yǔhuì) (4 October 2015 – 21 February 2020) was a four-year-old Singaporean girl who was killed by her mother Foo Li Ping (Note: Chinese: 符丽萍; pinyin: Fǔ Lìpíng) (alias Chloe Foo) and her mother's boyfriend Brian Wong Shi Xiang (Note: Chinese: 汪士翔; pinyin: Wāng Shìxiáng) in February 2020. Three months after her death, Khung's body was burned to ashes by the couple, who enlisted the help of Nouvelle Chua Ruo Shi (Note: Chinese: 蔡偌诗; pinyin: Cài Ruòshī) to assist them in disposing of the corpse.

Khung's death went unnoticed until five months later, when the Singapore Police Force received two separate police reports from Khung's maternal grandmother and biological father on 20 July 2020. The police arrested all three suspects within a week; on 25 July 2020, both Foo and Wong were charged with murder, while Chua was charged for disposal of the girl's corpse.

In 2025, both Wong and Foo pleaded guilty to charges in relation to the homicide and abuse of Khung; Foo was sentenced to 19 years' jail while Wong was given 30 years' jail with 17 strokes of the cane. A year later, in 2026, Chua was given 13 years in jail for helping to dispose of Khung's corpse.

== Background ==
=== Birth and early life ===
In her subsequent mitigation plea, Foo Li Ping stated that she started dating Simon Khung Wei Nan (Note: Chinese: 江伟南; pinyin: Jiāng Wěinán) (Simonboy) when she was 18 and he was 29, and both were using drugs during the relationship. When Foo discovered she was pregnant with Megan Khung, they decided to get married. Foo alleged that Simon Khung was abusive towards her during the relationship and subsequent marriage, as well as towards Megan after she was born in Singapore on 4 October 2015. Simon, who had an older brother, had gone to prison thrice from 2015 to 2019 for drug consumption. When Megan was about eighteen or nineteen months old, her parents, who were married on 12 May 2015, divorced; they had been married for over a year. Simon was formerly married with another woman and had one son, born in 2012; that marriage ended in divorce in 2012.

After the divorce, Foo gained custody of the girl and began a relationship with Wong Shi Xiang, and went to live with him. Megan Khung was cared for by her maternal grandmother, who doted on her granddaughter and shared a close relationship with her. Subsequently, Foo wanted to bring her daughter to live together with her and Wong. Khung's grandmother, who strongly disapproved of her daughter's relationship with Wong, objected to Foo bringing her granddaughter away, and Khung herself also did not want to stay with her mother. Still, Foo went ahead with the arrangement, and left with her daughter in September 2019. Afterwards, Foo cut off all contact with her mother, ex-husband and former-in-laws. Simon and her paternal relatives had requested that they take care of the girl but had their requests rejected by Foo, who insisted on raising Khung herself.

=== Abuse ===
Between February 2019 and February 2020, Khung was physically abused by Foo and Wong.

Between late February and early March 2019, Khung was caned by her mother and Wong when she urinated on the bed or sofa. The abuse was discovered when pre-school teachers and staff from Khung's kindergarten discovered the scars on her. The staff warned the couple that they would refer the case to the Ministry of Social and Family Development if the abuse persisted. Khung's mother then withdrew her from kindergarten, claiming that it did not teach her daughter Chinese.

After Khung went to live with her mother and Wong, the couple continued to physically abuse her. Regularly, Wong whipped her with a cane, slapped and punched her, and Foo often did not intervene to stop the abuse; she even joined Wong in caning the girl. Wong also taught Foo to abuse her daughter without leaving visible marks or injuries.

On 9 November 2019, Foo forced her daughter to wear her soiled diaper over her head out of anger that Khung had not told her the diaper was full. On 5 January 2020, Khung dripped her mucus on the couple while crying, and in retaliation, Foo slapped Khung, blew her own nose and wiped her mucus onto her daughter's face. Other instances of abuse and humiliation include the couple recording and parading the girl crying in public and shaving her hair. Foo had also drawn on Khung's face to punish her for playing with her cosmetics.

Between January and February 2020, the abuse escalated further with Wong inflicting crueller harm on Khung. He often used a baton to beat Khung and also dislocated her jaw, with Foo refusing to seek medical attention for Khung. During that same period, Khung was also forced to go naked in the flat, and was frequently starved except for times when she was allowed to eat depending on Wong's mood, and the couple forced Khung to sleep in a planter box.

== Khung's death and disappearance ==
On 21 February 2020, Megan Khung was abused and murdered by Wong Shi Xiang, who scolded her to not relieve herself if he let her sleep inside the house and even punched her in the stomach. Khung was laid on the ground and later died after the couple and their friend Nouvelle Chua Ruo Shi ignored the girl and went to consume drugs. A forensic pathologist opined that the possible cause of Khung's death was blood infection from inflammation, caused by ruptures or lacerations of Megan’s internal organs. After seeing the girl remaining motionless hours later, the couple and Chua tried to resuscitate the girl with electric shocks and CPR but failed to revive her, and to avoid the exposure of the abuse and their drug use, the trio decided to not report to the police. The body of Khung was hidden in a box, with her body being wrapped in a blanket and layers of cling film, and brown tape, and the box lid was sealed with cement.

On 8 May 2020, the couple and Chua gathered up a metal barrel and two boxes of charcoal. They took it to the car workshop of Wong's godfather and used them to burn the box containing Khung's corpse. They gathered up the ashes and threw them in the sea at East Coast Park.

Meanwhile, Khung's maternal grandmother, who was concerned about the loss of contact with her granddaughter and daughter, filed a missing person report with the accompaniment of a social welfare worker in January 2020, a month before Khung was murdered. Throughout the past few months before making the report, the agency kept in touch with Khung's maternal grandmother and encouraged her to continue contacting her daughter and monitor Khung's condition. On 20 July 2020, concerned for his daughter’s safety and whereabouts, Simon, who was just released from prison, also filed a police report to report her missing as well.

After assessing the missing person's reports by Khung's family, the police established that the girl was no longer alive. After a four-day police investigation, Foo and her boyfriend Wong were arrested on 24 July 2020 and expected to be charged with murder, while Chua herself was arrested for helping to dispose of the body.

== Criminal charges ==
On 25 July 2020, five days after their arrests, 33-year-old Wong and 24-year-old Foo were both charged with murder in relation to the death of four-year-old Khung. Under the Penal Code, offenders convicted of murder would face the death penalty. The third suspect, 30-year-old Chua, was charged with assisting the couple to dispose of the little girl's corpse. The charge of disposing of a corpse to prevent detection of an offence carried a sentence of up to seven years' imprisonment. Additionally, Wong also faced seven other unrelated charges, including drug consumption, drug possession, methamphetamine trafficking in November 2018, and possessing two samurai-style swords. He was also charged with assaulting a man in November 2018 by hitting and kicking him several times. Wong was out on bail for these above drug and assault offences when he abused and murdered Khung.

On 30 July 2020, Wong, Foo and Chua were all ordered to be remanded for investigations, as well as to undergo pre-trial psychiatric evaluation. Foo's family members engaged lawyers to represent Foo, and in the end, out of two defence counsels engaged by her family, Foo chose one of them, consisting of Josephus Tan and his associates Cory Wong and Marshall Lim, while the other, led by Peter Keith Fernando, was discharged. Wong engaged Vinit Chhabra to defend him.

On 3 August 2020, the remand order was extended for one week. Chua's lawyer Thangavelu objected to the further remand of his client on the grounds that her charge was not murder, but of disposal of a corpse, which do not warrant the death penalty like murder, and stating that Chua's case would be heard at the State Courts rather than the High Court, where trials for capital cases like murder were conducted. However, the objection was overruled by the district judge, who went ahead with the extension on the account that the prosecution needed more time to gather evidence to determine the roles played by each of the trio in Khung's death.

After the end of her prolonged remand order, Chua was eventually granted bail of S$50,000 on 13 August 2020, and thus released from prison with conditions to abide to, like curfew hours and wearing an electronic tag. Foo and Wong were still remanded in prison as murder suspects were not allowed to be released on bail. In September 2020, the psychiatric assessments of Wong and Foo were completed, but they remained in remand pending further investigations and trial.

== Trial of the perpetrators ==
=== Wong Shi Xiang and Foo Li Ping ===
On 28 February 2025, 38-year-old Wong and 29-year-old Foo claimed trial for the killing of Megan Khung. By then, the charges of murder were reduced and the couple pleaded guilty to lesser charges. Wong pleaded guilty to four charges, mainly one each of culpable homicide not amounting to murder (manslaughter), impeding investigations by disposing of a corpse, drug trafficking and drug consumption. Foo pleaded guilty to three charges, mainly one each of allowing the death of a child, child abuse and impeding investigations by disposing of a corpse.

The sentencing trial of both Wong and Foo was scheduled to begin on 3 April 2025. The prosecution, led by Deputy Public Prosecutor Marcus Foo, sought a sentence of 28 to 30 years' imprisonment with 15 to 17 strokes of the cane for Wong, in addition to a jail term of 15 to 20 years for Foo, citing the heinous nature of the abuse and Foo's breach of her maternal duties by failing to protect her daughter from abuse. On the other hand, the defence sought 20 to 22 years' jail and 11 strokes of the cane for Wong and not more than 22 years' jail for Foo.

On 3 April 2025, the trial judge, Justice Hoo Sheau Peng, delivered her verdict, sentencing Foo to 19 years' imprisonment, and Wong to 30 years' imprisonment and 17 strokes of the cane. In her verdict, Hoo condemned the couple for their "heinous and deplorable" acts of abuse against Khung, who was a vulnerable child "helplessly reliant" on the couple for her daily needs, but was ultimately shunned and mistreated by her own biological mother and Wong. Hoo stated that the abusive acts and humiliating recordings of the abuse illustrated the "absolute depravity" and "sadistic ends" of the defendants, which deprived Khung of her basic dignity.

The judge additionally admonished the couple for their utter lack of remorse, as they not only killed Khung in cold blood but also displayed "utter callousness and cruelty" through the manner of resuscitating her and burning her body to cover up their atrocities, which further robbed Khung of her dignity in death and cemented proof of the couple prioritising their self-preservation.

Furthermore, Hoo did not lend any mitigating weight in the pleas of the couple. In the case of Foo, who claimed in mitigation that she was abused by Wong, Hoo pointed out that no amount of wrongdoing committed against Foo was a justification for her to subject her daughter to mistreatment and violence even if the allegations of domestic abuse were true, and she could never be absolved of any liability for her deplorable conduct. As for Wong, Hoo rejected Wong's claim that he was under the influence of drugs and only trying to discipline Khung, dismissing it as an attempt to downplay his responsibility for the killing.

Noting that the sentences she passed were heavy, Hoo quoted in her own words:

"To reiterate, when parents or caregivers abuse their children in ways which torment them physically, mentally and emotionally, the court must, on behalf of society, impose stiff punishment reflecting the disapprobation of such conduct."

As such, Hoo handed the following sentences to the couple:

Foo Li Ping

1. Allowing the death of her child – 13 1/2 years' imprisonment (consecutive)
2. Disposal of a corpse – 5 1/2 years' imprisonment (consecutive)
3. Child abuse – Seven years' imprisonment (concurrent)

Wong Shi Xiang

1. Culpable homicide – 15 1/2 years' imprisonment and 12 strokes of the cane (consecutive)
2. Disposal of a corpse – Six years' imprisonment (consecutive)
3. Drug trafficking – 5 1/2 years' imprisonment and five strokes of the cane (consecutive)
4. Drug consumption – Three years' imprisonment (consecutive)

In total, Foo was sentenced to 19 years in prison, while Wong was sentenced to 30 years in prison with 17 strokes of the cane. Foo's jail term was backdated to 24 July 2020, while Wong's jail term was backdated to 23 July 2020.

After the end of sentencing, Foo was granted permission to speak to her mother and other relatives, who came to court to hear her sentence. It was confirmed that Foo would not appeal against her sentence.

=== Nouvelle Chua Ruoshi ===
On 26 October 2026, Chua pleaded guilty to conspiring to abuse Khung and disposing of her body. On 13 November 2026, she was sentenced to 13 years imprisonment.

== Response and impact of case ==
=== Pre-trial ===
When the murder of four-year-old Khung was brought to light, many Singaporeans were shocked and appalled at the case, with many expressing sympathy for the girl while some condemned the couple, especially Foo for her responsibility behind the death of her daughter. Khung's 63-year-old maternal grandmother was devastated at the death of her granddaughter, and struggling with the need to work as a cleaner and take care of her own 82-year-old mother (also Khung's maternal great-grandmother), Khung's maternal grandmother was also afraid of losing Foo to the gallows, because Foo was her only child and daughter, but she stated Foo should take responsibility for what she did. As for the paternal relatives of Khung's family, Khung's uncle (her father's older brother) expressed his rage and sadness at the plight of his niece, and stated he could not forgive Foo for doing such a terrible thing to her own flesh and blood, and he added that if Foo could not take care of herself, she should not have made the decision to raise Khung by herself. Both the maternal and paternal relatives of Khung hoped to conduct a funeral for Khung.

=== Simon Khung ===
The death of Khung also made an impact on the life of her biological father Simon Khung (aged 36 in 2023). Simon, who became addicted to drugs since age 16, stated that after finding out the death of his daughter, although he was heartbroken about the news and felt regret for not fulfilling his duties as a parent, it caused him to finally get himself together and quit taking drugs. Simon stated that after his third period of incarceration and release from Changi Prison (where he served all his three sentences) in 2019, he struggled with overcoming his addiction withdrawal symptoms and filled with both self-loathing and depression, and even attempted to commit suicide at one point. The death of his daughter served as a wake-up call for Simon to finally quit drugs for good, and hence first started to stay at a half-way house. Not only did Simon find a stable job, study part-time and rebuild his life, he partnered with the other former drug users to constantly advocate against drug consumption and spoke up about the dangers of drug use. Simon was named as the first ambassador of the Singapore Anti-Narcotics Association (SANA) in June 2024.

Simon would commemorate his daughter from time to time, and he still missed her even after she died. Since 2023, Simon operated a clothing brand and a production company, and also shared his experiences on TikTok under his alias "Simonboy", and he married for the third time in July 2024. Aside from advocating against drug use, Simon additionally expressed that he supported the death penalty for drug traffickers, citing that if it was completely abolished, the drug situation in Singapore would grow worse with more young people becoming drug abusers and ruining their lives as he and the other ex-abusers had in the past.

=== Post-trial ===
On 28 February 2025, the same date when both Foo and Wong pleaded guilty to killing Khung, Simon made a social media post as tribute to his late daughter, and he also added that he forgave his ex-wife in spite of what she had done to Khung. In his post, Khung's father also apologized for his failure to protect Khung and fulfill his paternal duties, and expressed regret for his mistakes. Local actress Sheila Sim paid a tribute to Khung on social media, expressing her condolences and hoped for the girl to rest in peace, while stating that it was heartbreaking as a mother herself to read Khung's story in the papers.

After the sentencing of Foo and Wong on 3 April 2025, Khung's father once again made a social media post, in which he apologised to his daughter. The sentencing of Khung's killers took place just six days before Khung's father welcomed the birth of his third child (a son), and Khung's father stated based on the legal outcome and its timing, he took it as a sign for him to move on from the ordeal. Foo's 70-year-old mother, who was briefly approached by the media after she attended her daughter's sentencing hearing, reportedly told the press that "everyone makes mistakes". She had reportedly advised Foo to behave in prison before she was taken back to prison.

On 8 April 2025, the Ministry of Social and Family Development (MSF) released a statement relating to the case of Khung's abuse. The statement revealed that based on their investigative findings, the social service agency handling Khung's case did not provide an adequate description of the severity of her injuries in a report, which was the cause of inadequate interventions made in her case. The agency's report further showed that they made out a plan for Khung to remain in the care of her maternal grandmother, who was assessed to be a more suitable caregiver than her mother and they received information that Khung was a well-behaved and cheerful student and hence they did not suspect child abuse, and their efforts were also hindered by Khung's later disappearance and transfer from her pre-school after moving in with Foo. It was further mentioned that in light of Khung's death, strengthened measures were introduced to ensure more effective steps in identifying and intervening in cases of potential child abuse.

The Singapore Children's Society and other social workers released a joint statement on 10 April 2025, stating that despite the shortcomings by the pre-school and social agencies in managing Khung's case, they had tried their best to help Khung and tried multiple times to raise the alarm after quickly picking up signs of Khung's abuse and also coordinated with the Early Childhood Development Agency (ECDA) and a Child Protection Specialist Centre (CPSC) for advice and strategy to help Khung. The Singapore Children's Society rounded up its statement by adding that it was the collective failure of the system that indirectly played a part in the death of Khung, and it required the protocols to be enhanced. The organization also recommended some changes like mandatory and adequate child protection training for pre-school staff members and the hiring of child safety officers in pre-school centres.

Theresa Tan, a senior social affairs correspondent who wrote for Singapore's national newspaper The Straits Times, published a commentary article and stated that the case of Khung highlighted the importance of combining the efforts of the authorities and members of all communities to protect children from abuse, and she noted that the government had tighten measures to curb child abuse since Khung's death and that it was not the sole burden and responsibility of social agencies to help manage and identify potential child abuse cases. In her own words, Tan quoted in her article that it "takes a village to keep a child safe from their abusive parents".

On 11 April 2025, after rounding up the responses of the social welfare agencies and police, which included additional information shared by the agencies in charge of Khung's case, the MSF announced that it would conduct a further review of Khung's case. On 23 October 2025, a government report uncovered many lapses and shortcomings among agencies responsible for the case.

In the aftermath of the case, the Ministry of Social and Family Development operationalised a new social services coordination unit, Sensemaking Alerts for Frontline Engagement and Response, in June 2026. The unit utilised information from various government agencies and a detection algorithm to flag potential cases of child abuse earlier for the relevant agencies to support the identified family better.

The case of Khung's abuse and murder was one of at least eight high-profile cases of child abuse resulting in death that occurred from 2015 to 2023. The other cases consisted of: the 2015 death of Mohamad Daniel Mohamad Nasser; the 2016 Toa Payoh child abuse case; the 2017 Ayeesha child abuse case; the 2018 murder of Nursabrina Agustiani Abdullah; the 2019 Yishun infant murder; the 2020 Jurong child killing and the 2023 killing of Zabelle Peh.

== See also ==
- Capital punishment in Singapore
- List of major crimes in Singapore
- List of solved missing person cases (2020s)

=== Other cases of murder with the bodies disposed by burning ===
- Leslie Khoo Kwee Hock – Singaporean convicted murderer
- Mandai burnt car murder – 1992 murder of a loan shark by two men in Singapore

=== Other cases of murdered children in Singapore ===
- Killing of Eva Soh – 1974 killing of a toddler girl in Singapore
- Murder of Usharani Ganaison – 1977 sexual assault and murder of a girl by her uncle in Singapore
- Murder of Cheng Geok Ha – 1977 case of missing girl found raped and murdered in Singapore
- Murder of Goh Beng Choo – 1980 unsolved murder of a girl in Singapore
- Toa Payoh ritual murders – 1981 series of murders and rapes in Singapore
- Ang Mo Kio family murders – 1983 family mass murder in Singapore
- Murder of Kuah Bee Hong – 1991 child murder in Singapore
- Death of Lim Shiow Rong – Unsolved case of girl raped and murdered in Singapore in 1995
- Murder of Huang Na – 2004 child rape and murder in Singapore
- Murder of Nonoi – 2006 high-profile child rape and murder case in Singapore
- Chin Swee Road child death – 2014 case of a girl who was abused and killed by her parents
