= Simonboy =

Singaporean content creator (born 1987)

Simon Khung
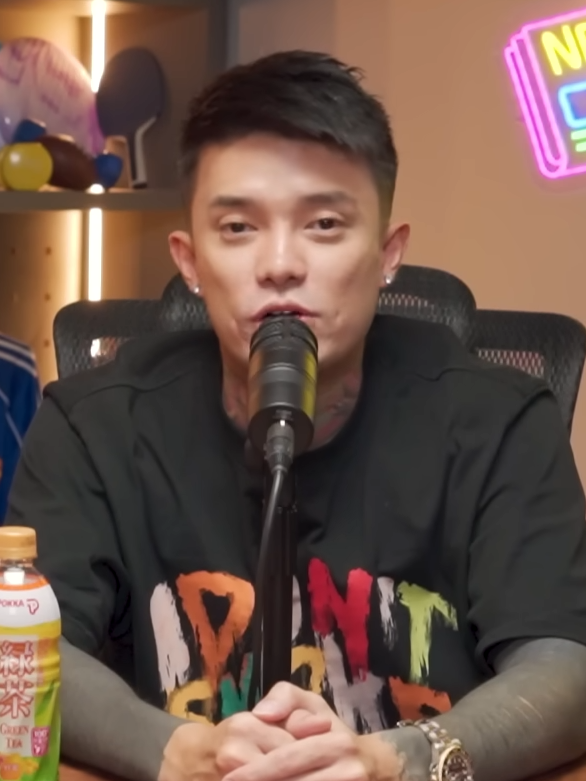
- Khung in 2024
- Born: Simon Khung Wei Nan; 6 November 1987 (age 38); Singapore
- Other name: Simonboy
- Occupations: Content creator; Actor; Entrepreneur
- Years active: 2021–present
- Known for: Anti-drug advocacy
- Spouses: 1st wife (name unknown) (divorced); Foo Li Ping (m. 2015; div. 2017); Chloe Eong (m. 2024)
- Children: 3, including Megan Khung (2015–2020)

Birth name
- Traditional Chinese: 江偉南
- Simplified Chinese: 江伟南
- Hanyu Pinyin: Jiāng Wěinán

Simon Khung Wei Nan (born 6 November 1987), better known as Simonboy, is a Singaporean social media influencer, activist and actor. A former drug addict with multiple convictions, he is now noted for his anti-drug advocacy.

== Biography ==
Simon Khung after leaving school at the age of 16, turned to marijuana as he was curious. He would have his father (Note: His father would later die from a stroke in 2013 after suffering from dementia.) to drive his taxi in the middle of night to ferry him while he transported drugs for his own use in 2010. In 2015, he was jailed for the first time after assaulting another person under the influence of drugs. Although released in 2016, he reoffended and was jailed twice more. His drug addiction had made him depressed and after attempting suicide, he recovered in a halfway house between 2019 and 2021. He started posting videos on social media in 2021.

He met his then-girlfriend, Chloe Eong via a dating app during his halfway house phase. At Eong's encouragement and with her financial assistance, he started his first business, a clothing apparel Chance. He would also run a production house.

In February 2024, Khung played a minor role in the movie, Money No Enough 3. In June 2024, he was named as the Singapore Anti-Narcotics Association's (Sana) first ambassador.

In June 2024, together with Peter Yu, Khung opened a chicken rice stall, Singabola, in Canberra, but it was short-lived, shuttered since as early as October 2024. A second outlet was opened in July 2024 in Choa Chu Kang, and closed in December 2024.

After the case on the killing of his daughter, Megan Khung concluded, Khung launched the Forever Megan Charity on 6 November 2025. He visited Good Samaritan Home, an orphanage located in Klang, and donated food, necessities, and money, as well as sharing his life experiences with the orphans there. While initially brushing off the online criticism that rose over the charity, about his parental role in Megan Khung as well as the use of her name for publicity, Khung sent a letter of demands through a lawyer to Xiaxue who criticised his parenting or lackof, requesting her to rescind her comments as well as a demand for money as compensation. The dispute went to the Singapore State Courts with a case management conference scheduled on 17 April 2026.

On 15 May 2025, it was announced that Khung would be one of the lead characters for the movie, 3 Good Guys, which was released in February 2026. On 19 November 2025, it was announced that he would play a supporting character in an upcoming movie, Pace.

== Personal life ==
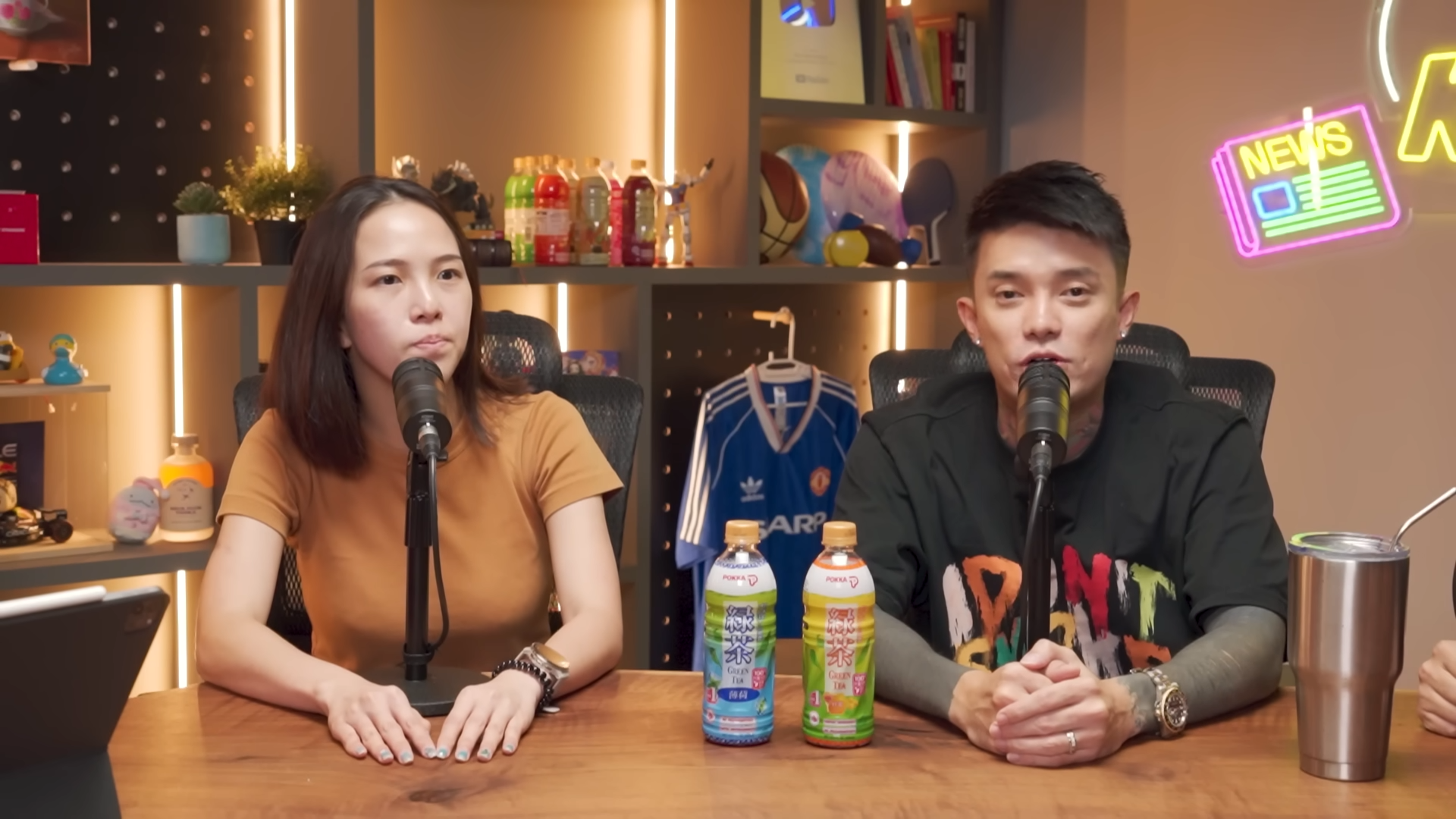
From left: Chloe Eong and Simon Khung.

Khung has been married three times and has had three children.

From his first marriage whose identity remains officially unknown, they had a son who was born in 2011–2012. Due to his prior drug addiction and incarceration, he would only meet this son in 2024, after having sought permission from his ex-wife. His second marriage in 2015 to Foo Li Ping, who is 11 years his junior, resulted in the birth of a daughter, Megan Khung, who was killed at the age of four in February 2020 through repeated abuse by Foo and her boyfriend, Brian Wong Shi Xiang. Khung and Foo divorced in 2017.

On 7 July 2024, Khung was married for the third time with a woman named Chloe Eong. On 9 April 2025, Khung announced the birth of their son.

== Filmography ==
Films
Year	Title	Role	Notes	Ref
2024	Money No Enough 3	-	Supporting role	
2026	3 Good Guys	Jeremy		
Upcoming	Pace		Supporting role	
