= Murder of Nursabrina Agustiani Abdullah =

2018 murder of a young girl in Singapore

Nursabrina Agustiani Abdullah
- Born: Nursabrina Agustiani Abdullah; 2014; Singapore
- Died: 2 September 2018 (aged 4); Bukit Batok, Singapore
- Cause of death: Blunt force trauma to the abdomen
- Other name: Sabrina
- Known for: Possible murder victim
- Parent(s): Syabilla Syamien Riyadi (mother); Muhammad Salihin Ismail (stepfather)

On 2 September 2018, four-year-old Nursabrina Agustiani Abdullah (2014 – 2 September 2018), also known as Sabrina, died from blunt force trauma to the abdomen after her stepfather physically assaulted her by pushing her and kicking her in the stomach twice, which resulted in extensive intra-abdominal bleeding that caused the girl to die a day after the assault, despite her parents' attempt to resuscitate her. Sabrina's stepfather, 25-year-old Muhammad Salihin bin Ismail, was later arrested and charged with murder, a crime that warrants the death penalty in Singapore. Salihin was also charged with having inflicted physical abuse on the girl twice between July 2017 and April 2018.

During his 2021 murder trial, Salihin admitted to the assault but stated that he never intended to kill Sabrina or kick Sabrina to result in her death, recounting that after his and his wife's unsuccessful attempts to toilet-train Sabrina in preparation for school, he was so enraged that he kicked at Sabrina twice but never intended for the blows to specifically hit his stepdaughter's stomach and cause severe injury to lead to her death. Despite the prosecution's arguments that Salihin had committed murder by intentionally causing the fatal abdominal injuries on Sabrina during his kicking, the judge found that Salihin never intended to cause his stepdaughter's death through the fatal injuries despite the deliberateness of the assault. Therefore, Salihin was convicted of voluntarily causing grievous hurt, and sentenced to nine years' imprisonment with 12 strokes of the cane.

In April 2024, the Court of Appeal allowed the prosecution's appeal against the murder acquittal. The court found Salihin guilty of the original charge of murder and re-sentenced him to life in prison with 12 strokes of the cane after they concluded that his deliberate actions of kicking Sabrina constituted an act of murder, since his intentional actions led to the injuries that caused Sabrina to die, even if he had no intent to cause her death.

== Background ==
Nursabrina Agustiani Abdullah, also addressed as Sabrina, was born in Singapore in 2014, and her mother Syabilla Syamien Riyadi, who was 17 when she gave birth to Sabrina, was an Indonesian-born Singapore permanent resident born in 1996. The identity of Sabrina's biological father, who was Syabilla's former partner, was unknown.

When Sabrina was two years old, her mother married a Singaporean citizen named Muhammad Salihin bin Ismail (born in 1993) on 31 August 2016. They had twin sons on 29 November 2016, and lived at a rented flat in Bukit Batok. From 2006 to 2016, Salihin had been sentenced to probation, reformative training and military detention (during his National Service) for various offences, ranging from theft, robbery to drug consumption. For his latest offence before the death of Sabrina, Salihin was released from the Singapore Armed Forces detention barracks in February 2017.

According to Salihin's sisters, father and stepmother, Salihin was a quiet man who never lost his temper, had a normal relationship with his wife, and treated Sabrina as his own daughter, treating her and the twins equally. Even so, Salihin's sisters confirmed that he once nearly punched their youngest brother over a minor dispute, and court documents showed that Salihin had inflicted physical violence on Sabrina on two occasions; once in July 2017 when he scalded her for five seconds using hot water while showering her, and another instance between January and April 2018 when Salihin slammed Sabrina's head on the floor. According to the defence, regarding the incident with the shower, Salihin was allegedly angry at Sabrina for not wanting to shower with cold water due to his need to save electricity costs and he thus turned on the maximum temperature to scald the girl in a fit of anger. In the second incident, Salihin was trying to feed Sabrina, who instead hid under her bed, which purportedly upset him, provoking him into hitting Sabrina's head.

== Sabrina's death ==
When Sabrina turned four in 2018, her parents planned to send her to kindergarten in late September 2018, and therefore tried to toilet-train her to prepare for pre-school, but Sabrina still urinated outside the toilet despite the efforts to educate her.

On the morning of 1 September 2018, Salihin was alone at home with Sabrina and her brothers after his wife left for work. According to court documents, Salihin witnessed a puddle of urine left by Sabrina and out of anger, he brought Sabrina to the toilet, where he placed Sabrina on the toilet bowl and used his fist to hold her in place, although the prosecution would allege that Salihin did so to punch his stepdaughter. Later that afternoon, Sabrina told her stepfather she wanted to go to the toilet, but Salihin told her to go by herself. Shortly after, when he checked on Sabrina, he spotted a puddle of urine in front of the toilet bowl, and Salihin angrily asked Sabrina about this discovery. Out of rage, Salihin pushed Sabrina down and kicked his leg forward twice, which hit Sabrina's stomach, and once again, he placed Sabrina on the toilet bowl.

Later that evening, during dinner, Sabrina did not have an appetite due to stomach pain after eating a few mouthfuls of chicken rice, and she vomited on the sofa. Salihin and his wife, who by then had returned home, both applied ointment on her stomach. The next day, between 1am and 8am, Sabrina continued to vomit periodically. During the last occasion, Salihin took the girl to the toilet and used his index finger to induce her to vomit as she had trouble doing so. After this, Sabrina fell unconscious. Salihin carried her out of the toilet and told his wife to call for an ambulance while he tried to use CPR to resuscitate his stepdaughter.

Despite Salihin's efforts, Sabrina was unresponsive to resuscitation efforts, and paramedics noted she did not have a pulse and had stopped breathing. Four-year-old Nursabrina Agustiani Abdullah was later pronounced dead in Ng Teng Fong General Hospital at about 10am. An autopsy by forensic pathologist Dr Gilbert Lau revealed that Sabrina died as a result of blunt force trauma to the abdomen, which caused internal bleeding. According to Dr Lau (who retired in July 2020), he found that there were over 300 millilitres of blood inside the abdominal area, which was equivalent to the victim losing 30% of her blood; this was considered fatal from a forensic perspective.

== Murder trial and acquittal ==
=== Arrest and court proceedings ===
A day after his stepdaughter died, 25-year-old Muhammad Salihin bin Ismail was arrested after the hospital authorities made a police report regarding Sabrina's death. Salihin was charged with murder, a crime that warrants the death penalty in Singapore. Salihin, who confessed to assaulting Sabrina by kicking her, also faced two counts of physically mistreating Sabrina back in 2017 and early 2018 before the fatal assault, although these two other charges were stood down after the defence successfully argued that Salihin should not be tried for all charges simultaneously to avoid any prejudice in Salihin's defence for the capital charge.

On 2 February 2021, Salihin stood trial for the murder of his stepdaughter. Salihin's charge of murder was slated under Section 300(c) of the Penal Code, which carries either a death sentence or life imprisonment with caning if found guilty. Salihin was originally represented by Syazana Yahya, before his case was taken over by notable criminal lawyer Eugene Thuraisingam (the founder of Syazana's law firm) in the midst of his trial, while Senthilkumaran Sabapathy was the trial prosecutor of the case.

During the trial, it was alleged by the prosecution that Salihin had punched Sabrina on the stomach several times during the two occasions to toilet-train her, and intentionally kicked her twice on the second occasion, and the accumulative effects of these assaults had resulted into abdominal injuries that caused Sabrina's death. Salihin's defence counsel sought to dispute the prosecution's case during his trial, stating that Salihin used his fist not to punch Sabrina, but to prevent Sabrina from getting off the toilet, and that both Salihin's error in applying CPR on Sabrina and her twin brothers' playful act of bouncing on Sabrina's stomach on the day of the assault could have also contributed significantly to the severity of the injuries on Sabrina's abdomen.

Sabrina's birth mother, who was arrested by the Central Narcotics Bureau in June 2020 for consuming methamphetamine, was called as a witness while she was remanded for trial. She testified that Sabrina showed a fist (in addition to saying her brothers had been sitting on her abdomen) when she complained of stomach pain, but Sabrina told her mother that Salihin never punched her. Subsequently, Sabrina's mother was sentenced to one year of imprisonment in June 2021, after she pleaded guilty to both drug consumption and drug possession.

=== Salihin's conviction ===
On 1 March 2022, after a trial lasting 12 days, Justice Pang Khang Chau, the trial judge hearing Salihin's case, delivered his verdict on conviction. In his judgement, Justice Pang stated that he found Salihin not guilty of murder, and therefore granted him an acquittal.

Explaining why he acquitted Salihin of murder, Justice Pang first touched on the four basic elements required to prove a charge of murder under Section 300(c) of the Penal Code:

1. A bodily injury must be present and objectively proved;
2. The nature of the injury must be objectively proved;
3. It must be established that the injury was intentionally inflicted; and
4. The injury must be sufficient to cause death in the ordinary cause of nature.

Justice Pang stated that after carefully scrunitizing Salihin's case with these four principles, he found that the third element was not proven by the prosecution, because the evidence showed that despite the deliberateness of the assault, Salihin had kicked the girl not out of intention, but rather out of a spontaneous angry reaction, and did not aim at any particular part of her body. Salihin had stated that in a fit of anger, he simply kicked what was in front of him, and it happened to be Sabrina's abdomen. Salihin's subsequent acts of applying ointment on her stomach corroborated his lack of intention to cause the fatal injuries and lack of knowledge of the severity of her injuries.

Justice Pang also noted that the fatal injuries on Sabrina's abdomen cannot be solely attributed to Salihin's kicks based on the medical report, though he pointed out the contributory effect of Sabrina's brothers jumping on her stomach and Salihin's excessive force in applying CPR were negligible. Justice Pang also accepted that Salihin never punched his stepdaughter, and had used his knuckles and fist to hold Sabrina in place on the toilet bowl. In summary, 29-year-old Muhammad Salihin bin Ismail was acquitted of murder, but he was found guilty of a lesser charge of voluntarily inflicting grievous hurt, an offence that warranted a sentence of up to ten years' imprisonment, in addition to a fine or caning.

Sentencing was adjourned to a later date after Salihin's conviction. The prosecution filed submissions to seek the maximum of ten years' imprisonment and 12 strokes of the cane for Salihin while the defence sought a sentence of seven years and six months' imprisonment and 12 strokes of the cane.

=== Salihin's sentence ===
On 9 May 2022, two months after Salihin's conviction for fatally assaulting Sabrina, Justice Pang delivered his verdict on Salihin's sentence.

In his judgement, Justice Pang found that the manner of Salihin's attack, his criminal record, and the vulnerability of the victim were the aggravating factors that weighed against Salihin and were sufficient to call for a severe sentence. He disagreed with the prosecution's stand that Salihin's delay in seeking medical attention for Nursabrina was also an aggravating factor, because in Salihin's position, the absence of visible external injuries on Sabrina and her repetitive vomiting and abdominal discomfort "may not have sufficiently alerted the accused (Salihin) that she sustained significant injuries" and that was not relevant to determine his culpability during the offence.

Despite his acceptance of most of the prosecution's arguments, Justice Pang also accepted the defence's arguments that Salihin was remorseful and had fully cooperated with the authorities from the beginning of investigations. Therefore, the judge sentenced 29-year-old Muhammad Salihin bin Ismail to nine years' imprisonment and 12 strokes of the cane, and the jail term was backdated to the date of his arrest. The other two charges of causing hurt to Sabrina were also taken into consideration during sentencing.

== Prosecution's appeal and murder conviction ==
Shortly after the sentencing of Salihin for causing grievous hurt in May 2022, the Attorney-General's Chambers announced that the prosecution would appeal against Salihin's murder acquittal, as well as Salihin's sentence for voluntarily causing serious injury. Salihin's counsel also appealed his sentence.

On 2 April 2024, the Court of Appeal heard the appeals. From the prosecution's side, with regards to Salihin's conviction, they argued that it did not matter whether or not Salihin had intended to strike Sabrina on any specific part of the body, as he already confessed to having kicked his stepdaughter forcefully and on purpose, and his actions in turn had caused the death of Sabrina. They thus sought to have Salihin found guilty of the original charge of murder, finding that his acquittal should be revoked.

On the same date, after deliberating the arguments on both sides, the three-judge panel - consisting of Chief Justice Sundaresh Menon and two Judges of Appeal, Debbie Ong Siew Ling and Tay Yong Kwang - released their decision, ruling that 31-year-old Muhammad Salihin Ismail should be convicted of murder under Section 300(c) of the Penal Code, and therefore increased his initial jail term of nine years to life imprisonment, the minimum punishment allowed for murder in Singapore. The appellate court, however, upheld the 12 strokes of the cane imposed by the original trial judge back in May 2022.

In their grounds of decision, the appellate court stated that the law did not require the prosecution to prove that a defendant accused of murder had the intention to cause the medical consequences of his actions. Chief Justice Menon, who read out the verdict in court, pointed out that even if Salihin genuinely never meant to specifically kick Sabrina so as to cause her fatal abdominal injuries but did so in a moment of impulse and anger, it did not discount the fact that he deliberately and intentionally kicked Sabrina in order to teach her a lesson, which resulted in the abdominal injuries on Sabrina, such that the injuries were sufficient in the ordinary course of nature to cause death. The defence had admitted that the force used by Salihin to kick Sabrina was sufficient to cause her death. Based on these findings, the appellate court agreed that the trial judge had erred in acquitting Salihin due to wrongful interpretation of the law, and Salihin should assume the fullest responsibility for having unlawfully caused Sabrina's death as a consequence of his actions.

The three judges unanimously allowed the prosecution's appeal, and upgraded Salihin's conviction to murder. They therefore re-imposed a life sentence but upheld the 12 strokes of the cane, after the appellate court agreed with both the prosecution and defence that the death penalty was not appropriate in light of the various factors surrounding the death of Sabrina, and noted that both sides concurred on sentence. The life sentence passed upon Salihin was backdated to the date of his arrest on 3 September 2018.

== Aftermath ==
According to 2025 news reports covering the abuse and killing of Megan Khung, the murder of Nursabrina Agustiani Abdullah was listed as one of at least eight most high-profile cases of child abuse resulting in death that happened in Singapore between 2015 and 2023.

== See also ==
- Caning in Singapore
- Life imprisonment in Singapore
- Capital punishment in Singapore
- 2016 Toa Payoh child abuse case
- Yishun infant murder
- Murder of Nonoi
