= Ayeesha child abuse case =

2015–17 child abuse and murder of a five-year-old girl in Singapore

- Location: Unknown location within Singapore
- Date: December 2015 – 11 August 2017
- Attack type: Murder; Child abuse
- Deaths: 1
- Injuries: 1
- Victims: Deceased; Ayeesha (5; real name unknown); Survived; Ayeesha's brother (4; real name unknown)
- Perpetrators: Ayeesha's father (real name unknown); Ayeesha's stepmother
- Motive: Child abuse
- Charges: Ayeesha's father Murder (x1); Child abuse (x17); Wrongful confinement (x2); Causing disappearance of evidence and lying to police (x6); Ayeesha's stepmother None
- Verdict: Ayeesha's father pleaded guilty to five counts of child abuse and one count of manslaughter Ayeesha's father sentenced to 34.5 years' jail and 12 strokes of the cane Ayeesha's father's jail term increased to 35 years' jail due to him medically unfit to be caned Ayeesha's father sentenced to life imprisonment by the Court of Appeal
- Convictions: Ayeesha's father Manslaughter; Child abuse (x5); Causing disappearance of evidence (x1); Ayeesha's stepmother None
- Convicted: Ayeesha's father (44)
- Judge: Aedit Abdullah

On 11 August 2017, at an unspecified location in Singapore, a five-year-old Singaporean girl, whose first name was Ayeesha, died in her flat (apartment) after being severely starved and abused by her biological father. Before her death, Ayeesha and her younger brother had both been confined naked inside the toilet of her father's flat for ten months and ill-treated for about two years; Ayeesha's brother survived the abuse despite the extensive trauma and injuries he endured. Ayeesha's father was arrested and charged with murder, and also faced 25 counts of abusing the two children.

The father's murder trial began in May 2023. In April 2024, he pleaded guilty to manslaughter and child abuse and was sentenced to an "unprecedented" 34 years and six months' imprisonment and 12 strokes of the cane; the identities of him and Ayeesha were suppressed to protect his son. The imprisonment term was increased to 35 years in July 2024 after the father was found to be medically unfit for caning. On 11 July 2025, the Court of Appeal dismissed an appeal by him and replaced his 35-year sentence with life imprisonment.

== Background and abuse ==
Ayeesha was born in Singapore in 2012, and she had one younger brother who was a year her junior. Her father, who separated from Ayeesha's biological mother at one point, remarried another woman who became Ayeesha's stepmother, and had three children with her. A daughter from a previous marriage of Ayeesha's stepmother also lived with the couple. Background information of Ayeesha's father revealed that he was trained in silat, taekwondo and aikido. He formerly worked as an auxiliary police officer from 2003 to 2016. From 2016 to April 2017, Ayeesha's father worked in a fast food restaurant, and he was jobless since then. In 2015, Ayeesha's father faced financial difficulties and he had to cut down on his purchase of food and diapers. Ayeesha's father and stepmother also reduced the children's meals to twice a day. After the divorce of Ayeesha's biological parents, both Ayeesha and her brother were initially placed in foster care in June 2014, before they were returned to live with their father in early 2015. Following this, members of a family welfare centre would regularly monitor the welfare of the children and check up on them, and the father even took both children for a counselling session at the centre in May 2015. However, since then, the children had not been seen by any case officer and the father did not send them for schooling, and he often lied to the welfare workers that the children were under the care of his mother or other relatives.

Ayeesha's father and his wife began to abuse both Ayeesha and her biological younger brother in December 2015. Due to their father decreasing their daily meal intake, Ayeesha and her brother started to eat their own faeces to ease their hunger and even played with them, which resulted in them being hit. From February to October 2016, the couple confined the two siblings in a designated naughty corner, which was a narrow space between a bookshelf and a wardrobe to prevent them from escaping, and a CCTV camera was also set up to keep the two children under surveillance. The children, who were continually abused by their father daily, were only allowed to come out of the naughty corner to have their meals or shower. Starting from October 2016, both Ayeesha and her brother were confined naked inside the toilet, and they were only allowed to come out whenever it was mealtime or the adults wanted to use the toilet. One excerpt of the CCTV footage from Ayeesha's one-room flat also showed the two siblings wearing only their diapers when they were locked up in their former naughty corner prior to their confinement in the toilet. The confinement of Ayeesha and her brother in the toilet would last for ten months before the death of Ayeesha in August 2017.

Only some instances of the abuse was revealed publicly when the case came into light. One documented instance of the abuse took place on 27 March 2016, when Ayeesha's father had violently assaulted Ayeesha by hitting her for at least 86 times, and the callous and relentless assault lasted for 16 minutes, and the whole abuse was shown on the CCTV footage captured inside the flat. Ayeesha's father was reportedly angered at Ayeesha for smearing her faeces on the wall and while changing her diapers, it incensed him so much that he brutally assaulted her out of rage. Additionally, Ayeesha's father had also repeatedly slapped the girl, as well as punching, caning and kicking her, and he also pulled her body up by holding her hair before punching her. Another incident happened on 27 August 2016, when Ayeesha's father repeatedly used a cane to hit both Ayeesha and her brother inside the living room.

In October 2016, Ayeesha's father contacted a welfare officer and expressed his intention to give both Ayeesha and her brother up for adoption, and he also had the intent to place the children in foster care out of fear that he might harm the two of them in a fit of anger. However, he ultimately did not follow through with the adoption plans. In fact, the adoption process required the mutual consent of Ayeesha's biological mother or the Ministry of Social and Family Development (MSF) could go ahead with the adoption without requiring the consent of Ayeesha's birth mother.

== Ayeesha's murder ==
On the night of 10 August 2017, the tenth month of Ayeesha's confinement in the toilet, Ayeesha's stepmother, then pregnant with her third child, complained to her husband that Ayeesha defied her instructions to do squats. In response, Ayeesha's father grabbed Ayeesha's arm and pulled her up, before he smacked her 15 to 20 times on her face, before he went to bed for the rest of the night. At about 3am on 11 August 2017, for the second time, Ayeesha's stepmother complained to her husband that both Ayeesha and her brother were sleeping in a weird posture, which prompted Ayeesha's father to punch the two children on their backs. Things were worse for Ayeesha especially, as her father slapped her and even kicked and stamped on her.

As a result of the ruthless and relentless attack, five-year-old Ayeesha was mortally wounded and she eventually died from her injuries. Ayeesha weighed just 13.2 kg (29.1 lbs) at the time of her death, and she was reported to have sustained multiple scars, marks and other external injuries all over her body, and she was also severely malnourished. Ayeesha's death was only discovered on the evening of 11 August, when Ayeesha's stepmother went to use the toilet, and she alerted her husband, who tried to resuscitate his daughter using CPR but to no avail. However, Ayeesha's father tried to cover up the death of Ayeesha by disposing of the evidence, including the CCTV camera, into different rubbish bins at nearby blocks during the early hours of 12 August 2017. Aside from this, Ayeesha's father told his wife to file a police report against him for physically assaulting up and raping her.

After undergoing efforts to cover up the murder, Ayeesha's father proceeded to bring both Ayeesha and her brother to Singapore General Hospital (SGH), where he lied to the hospital authorities that the girl became unresponsive that morning. Ayeesha was pronounced dead at the hospital and the brother was hospitalized for his injuries. Ayeesha's brother was not only discovered to be severely undernourished, he was also diagnosed with global developmental delay due to social deprivation. The boy had to undergo physiotherapy, occupational therapy and speech therapy. At the time he was admitted to hospital, Ayeesha's brother was not able to stand on his own despite reaching the age of four and he spent more than three months in hospital, before he was well enough to be placed in foster care. An autopsy was carried out and it was certified that Ayeesha died as a result of a fatal head injury caused by blunt force trauma.

== Criminal charges ==
After the death of Ayeesha, the police was alerted by the hospital authorities regarding the case, and her father was questioned by the police over the death of his daughter. At first, he lied to the police in a total of five statements from 12 to 17 August 2017 that Ayeesha died because she had hit her head on a playground slide. However, after the police gathered sufficient incriminating evidence that contradicted the man's story, Ayeesha's father eventually admitted that he was responsible for the injuries sustained by his daughter. As a result, Ayeesha's father was charged with murder and ill-treating both Ayeesha and her brother.

On 15 May 2023, six years after he allegedly killed Ayeesha, the case of Ayeesha's father was first revealed to the media for the first time, when he appeared in court to await confirmation to stand trial for his daughter's abuse and murder. Altogether, Ayeesha's father faced a total of 26 criminal charges, which consisted of one count of murder, two counts of wrongfully confining Ayeesha and her brother, six counts of causing evidence of a murder case to disappear and lying to police, and 17 counts of child abuse (eight for ill-treating Ayeesha and nine for ill-treating Ayeesha's brother). Deputy Public Prosecutor (DPP) Han Ming Kuang, the prosecutor in charge of the case, argued for the toilet confinement charge relating to the girl and the six counts of destroying evidence to be jointly tried with the murder charge, stating that these lesser charges were committed at around the same location and same timing when the murder happened, and they were ought to be jointly proceeded during the trial due to their close relation to the sole charge of murder. Mervyn Cheong, the lawyer representing Ayeesha's father, objected to the prosecution's application on the grounds that it would be unfair and prejudicial for his client to have to defend himself against additional charges that carry a less severe outcome compared to a murder charge.

Four days later, on 19 May 2023, the High Court ruled that Ayeesha's father should only stand trial for solely the charge of murdering his daughter, while the remaining 25 charges were to be held in abeyance while pending the outcome of the proceedings. The murder trial was scheduled to begin at the High Court two months later on 5 July 2023.

== Trial of Ayeesha’s father ==
=== Murder trial hearing ===
The murder trial of Ayeesha's father, then 43 years old, began on 5 July 2023. The trial was presided over by Justice Aedit Abdullah, and the prosecution was led by Deputy Public Prosecutor (DPP) Han Ming Kuang while Ayeesha's father was represented by Mervyn Cheong. From the start, Ayeesha and her father were not named in the media because of a gag order that was imposed to protect the identity of Ayeesha's surviving brother.

The court heard about the extensive abuse sustained by Ayeesha and her brother through those past two years leading up to her death. Ayeesha's 32-year-old stepmother, who was not charged for her involvement in the abuse, was summoned to court as the prosecution's first witness. Ayeesha's stepmother, who had filed for divorce at the time of the trial, told the court about the instances where she witnessed her husband beating her stepchildren up abnormally as though they were adults, and during her time on the stand, Ayeesha's stepmother admitted that she felt nothing for her stepchildren and hence did not step in to stop the assaults, although she also spoke at one point that she did feel remorseful for the death of Ayeesha. Additionally, during the defence's cross-examination, Ayeesha's stepmother kept replying that she did not remember when she was asked about her indifference whenever she witnessed the abuse and the differences between her oral testimony in court and police statements. For this, the defence sought to impeach Ayeesha's stepmother as a prosecution witness. They also suggested to the court that Ayeesha's stepmother might be involved in the murder of five-year-old Ayeesha. When asked why did she not intervene, Ayeesha's stepmother said that her husband told her to take care of her own children while he would take care of his, and she had feared incurring her husband's anger should she ever tried to intervene, and she denied that it was her idea of having a naughty corner to confine Ayeesha and her brother.

Dr Tess Teo Lin, a doctor who tended to Ayeesha after her admission to hospital, testified in court that when Ayeesha arrived at the hospital's emergency department, she found the girl skinnier than anyone she had seen. She also noticed the girl having severe head injuries, as well as sores on her toes and red spots on her limbs. Dr Teo also told the court that she noticed a "foul odour" coming from the girl's body, and noted that the girl's appearance looked unkempt. Leong Hsiao Tung, an analyst of the Health Sciences Authority, presented a toxicology report, which showed that substances from anti-vomiting medication and anti-histamines were detected in both the urine and blood samples of Ayeesha.

=== Plea of guilt and sentencing ===
Halfway through the murder trial, the prosecution offered to reduce the charge of murder to one of culpable homicide not amounting to murder, which was equivalent to manslaughter in Singaporean legal terms, on the condition that Ayeesha's father plead guilty. The offender accepted the offer and hence, he no longer faced the death penalty for murdering Ayeesha; a manslaughter charge could carry the maximum sentence of life imprisonment and a possible fine or caning if convicted. On 30 April 2024, Ayeesha's father pleaded guilty to one count of manslaughter and five other charges, including four counts of child abuse and one count of disposal of evidence. The remaining 20 charges were also taken into consideration during sentencing, which was slated to take place on that same day.

The prosecution sought a total of 30 to 34 years' imprisonment and at least 12 strokes of the cane. Deputy Public Prosecutor (DPP) Norine Tan adduced the CCTV evidence to demonstrate the horrific abuse captured on camera, though condensed into several minutes of footage, was the same type of ill-treatment that the two siblings had gone through daily for the final two years of Ayeesha's life and its impact on the two children. DPP Tan argued that the nature of the abuse "squarely falls within the worst of its type" and would "break the will of any human being", much less two extremely young kids in similar situations as Ayeesha and her brother. On the other hand, defence lawyer Mervyn Cheong and his associates urged the court to sentence their client to a shorter jail term of between 18 and 20 years, given that their request on sentence was in line with the precedent cases and the prosecution's proposed punishment of 30 to 34 years' jail was unprecedented. In rebuttal, the prosecution stated that the facts of the case itself were themselves unprecedented, and implied that such a sentence was warranted.

After the end of closing submissions, Justice Aedit Abdullah delivered his verdict on sentence. In his judgement, Justice Abdullah stated that the sentence he was about to pass was indeed unprecedented, but he pointed out that the man had subjected his two children to "inhumane, disgusting abuse", and that his punishment had to reflect the "abhorrence and disgust of the community". Justice Abdullah stated that the father had inflicted not just physical abuse, but also emotional and mental trauma, and his actions were tantamount to the concept of a naughty corner being mutated into a device of torture. The judge also admonished Ayeesha's father for crossing the line when it comes to any extent of discipline and having made use of his children as punching bags for whatever frustration or anger he felt, and he personally addressed Ayeesha's father in court, "Your remorse cannot reverse the death of Ayeesha, or the suffering she and your son went through. You must make your own peace with what you had done."

Citing the primary consideration behind the sentence as retribution, Justice Abdullah stated in his own words:

"It is punishment to reflect the state's denouncing of such loathsome and sickening acts. Others must also be severely deterred from committing any abuse of this kind."

Therefore, Ayeesha's 44-year-old father was sentenced to a total of 34 1/2 years' imprisonment and 12 strokes of the cane, a sentence which was six months higher than what the prosecution asked for. Justice Abdullah also lifted the gag order on Ayeesha's first name to allow the media to report her first name and to let society remember her. Still, Ayeesha's surname and the identities of her father and stepmother were withheld to protect the identity of her brother. The prosecution also confirmed that they would be reviewing the case against Ayeesha's stepmother, who was named as an co-accused in her husband's charges of confining Ayeesha and her brother in the toilet.

=== Remittal of caning and additional jail time ===
On 9 July 2024, Ayeesha's father, who was found to be medically unfit for caning due to a degenerative disc disease, returned to court to have the issue of his caning re-examined. The prosecution sought to have his caning of 12 strokes converted to an additional jail time of six months in lieu of caning, while the defence asked to not raise his jail term.

After hearing the submissions, Justice Aedit Abdullah accepted the prosecution's arguments to enhance the sentence and thus imposed an additional jail term of six months on top of the defendant's 34 1/2-year jail term, meaning that the offender would serve a total of 35 years' jail for the killing of Ayeesha. The judge stated that the crime was exceptionally brutal and there was a "clear call for retribution" and need to show society's abhorrence towards the actions of the accused.

=== Appeal and life imprisonment of Ayeesha's father ===
On 11 July 2025, Ayeesha's father filed an appeal to reduce his overall jail term from 35 years to a lesser term of between 25 1/2 years to 30 years. However, the Court of Appeal had not only rejected the appeal, but increased the sentence to life imprisonment, the maximum punishment for manslaughter under Singaporean law (the man's original sentence for manslaughter was actually 15 years out of the 35-year term).

In their submissions prior to sentencing, Deputy Public Prosecutors James Chew and Maximilian Chew argued that life imprisonment was not disproportionate to the heinous nature of the crime and the offender's culpability, even though they did not appeal the sentence; they added that the upper tier of sentencing should apply in this case based on its aggravating factors, and cited that the appellate court still had the discretion to enhance an offender's sentence in the absence of an appeal by the prosecution, provided that there was sufficient reasons to require this move. The defence, led by Mervyn Chong and Lim Yi Zheng, argued that the 15-year sentence was appropriate and the case was not one of the worst cases of manslaughter, and the man deserved further sentencing discount due to his timely plea of guilt. However, the three appellate judges, Chief Justice Sundaresh Menon, Justice Steven Chong and Justice Judith Prakash, rejected the defence's argument and in the end, aligned with the prosecution and thus sentenced Ayeesha's father to life in prison. The court's full grounds of decision is set to be published on a later date.

In accordance with the landmark appeal of Abdul Nasir Amer Hamsah on 20 August 1997, life imprisonment in Singapore was construed as a sentence of imprisonment for the rest of a prisoner's natural life, deviating from its old definition as a fixed term of 20 years' imprisonment. All future natural life sentences imposed in Singapore after the date of the verdict, including that of Ayeesha's father, carries the possibility of parole after a minimum period of 20 years behind bars.

== Indictment of Ayeesha's stepmother ==
On 7 January 2025, Ayeesha's stepmother was charged with four counts of ill-treatment of a child. The offence carries the maximum sentence of four years in prison or a S$4,000 fine or both. She also faced two counts of providing false information to a public servant, which was punishable by either a fine or up to two years' jail or both.

Ayeesha's stepmother, who is out on bail, was originally set to return to court on 4 February 2025 to plead guilty. However, the hearing was adjourned to a later date.

On 13 March 2026, the woman pleaded guilty to two counts of ill-treating a child, and one count of making a false police report. She was sentenced to six years and three months in prison by District Judge Eugene Teo. Likewise, Ayeesha's stepmother was not publicly named due to a gag order to protect the identity of Ayeesha's surviving brother.

== Aftermath ==
In the aftermath of Ayeesha's fatal abuse, as well as the 2019 Chin Swee Road child death, the Ministry of Social and Family Development (MSF) implemented various changes to enhance child protection protocols, which included the regular check-ups and monitoring of the welfare of vulnerable family members, including the victims of child abuse and those discharged from foster care. It also mandated the right of welfare workers to gain access to children whose parents refused to comply to the regular check-ups and consultation from child welfare organizations. Ayeesha's surviving brother, as well as Ayeesha's other four step-siblings, were placed under foster care as of 10 May 2024. Members of the public were also shocked at the brutality of the girl's murder, and some were so concerned that they expressed that there should be stricter measures required to address the phenomenon of child abuse.

The killing of Ayeesha, together with several other high-profile cases of children who died from child abuse, including the 2014 Chin Swee Road child death, the 2016 Toa Payoh child abuse case and the 2020 Jurong child killing, brought widespread attention to the phenomenon of child abuse in Singapore, and it prompted the government to impose stricter measures to ensure the safeguard of child welfare and curb child abuse. On 23 September 2023, seven months before the sentencing of Ayeesha's father, CNA's reporter Alison Jenner wrote an exclusive article to touch on the subject of child abuse. Citing the Ayeesha case and several other significant cases aforementioned, Jenner reported that child abuse has become a persistent social issue worldwide and it could be hard to detect due to the difficulty for people to detect the warning signs and these cases often happen behind closed doors and thus it posed various challenges for welfare groups to uncover these cases, irrespective to whether the victim died from child abuse. Jenner also stated it was the collective responsibility of every member of society to raise alarm and notice these cases and safeguard the children's welfare. Jenner also brought up statistical data by the Child Protective Service (CPS), which had investigated 2,141 abuse cases in 2021, an increase of 63 per cent from the 1,313 cases in 2020. Jenner ended her writing of the article by stating that the case of Ayeesha and those other cases should highlight the need for a more vigilant community and remind people of the importance of protecting children from abuse.

During the same month when Ayeesha's father had his caning commuted, the abuse-cum-killing of Ayeesha was again mentioned in July 2024 when the offence of allowing the death of a child by abuse once again became a topic of public discussion, given that there were continually cases of one parent joining another in abusing their children, whether or not the outcome resulted in the death of the child.

In 2025, after the sentencing of Foo Li Ping and her boyfriend for the abuse and killing of Megan Khung (Foo's daughter), the death of Ayeesha was recalled as one of at least eight most high-profile cases of child abuse resulting in death that happened in Singapore between 2015 and 2023.

== See also ==
- Caning in Singapore
- Life imprisonment in Singapore
- Yishun infant murder
- Killing of Megan Khung
- 2020 Jurong child killing
- Chin Swee Road child death
- 2016 Toa Payoh child abuse case
- List of major crimes in Singapore
