= Ahmad Nizam Abbas =

Singaporean lawyer

Ahmad Nizam bin Abbas PBM
- Born: 1967 (age 57–58); Singapore
- Education: Keele University (BA); Singapore Management University (LLM)

Ahmad Nizam bin Abbas PBM is a Singaporean family lawyer and Syariah law practitioner.

== Early life and education ==
Ahmad was born to Abbas Abu Amin, a People's Action Party Member of Parliament (MP), and his wife Aishah Daud. Ahmad has attention-deficit hyperactivity disorder and experienced some difficulties in school. He earned a Bachelor of Arts degree in law and English from the University of Keele in 1991, qualifying as an English barrister in 1992 and a Singapore lawyer in 1994. Over two decades later, he attained a Master of Laws in Islamic law and finance from Singapore Management University in 2013.

== Career ==
Ahmad began his career as a criminal defence lawyer, before specialising in family law. As a defense lawyer, he was involved in the case of Ghazali Abdul Manaf, a prisoner who was beaten to death by prison officers. He also represented Tan Eng Hwa, a man who was jailed for six months for loitering and "appearing to be waiting for a chance to commit a crime". In 2013, Ahmad represented a pair of Chinese hotel chefs who had received bribes from a seafood company. In 2023, he represented former auxiliary policeman Mohamad Fazli Selamat, who was convicted of the manslaughter of his stepdaughter and sentenced to 15 years and 11 months' imprisonment and 12 strokes of the cane.

He worked at Straits Law Practice before joining Emerald Law as a senior partner, subsequently founding his own firm, Crescent Law Chambers. In 2023, he was appointed deputy chairman of Simba Law Alliance, a coalition of regional law firms in Southeast Asia.

Ahmad has been a member of numerous boards and committees, including Mediacorp, the Mendaki Club, the National Youth Forum, the Censorship Review Committee, and the Law Society's Muslim law practice committee. He wrote a number of op-eds on the Today newspaper on his work at the National Youth Forum. In 2006, he was projected to run for political office in Tampines, but did not end up doing so. In 2021, he became a founding member of Defense Fund SG, an initiative that provides pro-bono legal support to victims of sexual harassment. For his work in public service, he was awarded the Pingat Bakti Masyarakat in 2007.

Ahmad is also active in legal publication. He wrote the first Muslim family law textbook in Singapore.

== Publications ==
- The Islamic Legal System in Singapore, 21 Pac. Rim L & Pol'y J. 163 (2012)
- Custody issues - differences and similarities between civil and Syariah courts in Singapore, Singapore Academy of Law Journal, 30(Special issue), 695–726 (2018)
- Muslim Family Law In Singapore, Singapore Academy of Law (2022)
