= 2020 Jurong child killing =

2020 child abuse and murder of an 11-year-old girl in Singapore

- Location: Jurong, Singapore
- Date: March 2020 – 6 November 2020
- Attack type: Murder; Child abuse
- Deaths: 1
- Injuries: 0
- Victim: Unnamed 11-year-old female victim
- Perpetrators: Roslinda Jamil (30); Mohamad Fazli Selamat (29)
- Charges: Mohamad Fazli Selamat; Murder (x1); 16 other charges, including child abuse and voluntarily causing hurt Roslinda Jamil; Murder (x1); Eight other charges, including child abuse
- Verdict: Mohamad Fazli Selamat; Fazli pleaded guilty to five counts of child abuse and one count of manslaughter Fazli sentenced to 15 years and 11 months' jail and 12 strokes of the cane Roslinda Jamil; Roslinda pleaded guilty to two counts of child abuse and one count of being an accessory to a child's death in the same household Roslinda sentenced to jail for seven years, eight months and three weeks
- Convictions: Mohamad Fazli Selamat; Manslaughter (x1); Child abuse and voluntarily causing hurt with a weapon (x5); Roslinda Jamil; Allowing the death of a child (x1); Child abuse (x2)
- Convicted: Roslinda Jamil (30); Mohamad Fazli Selamat (29)
- Judge: Pang Khang Chau

From March to November 2020, an 11-year-old Singaporean girl, whose name was withheld due to a gag order, was physically abused by her stepfather Mohamad Fazli Selamat and mother Roslinda Jamil inside their Jurong flat. The girl died on 10 November 2020, four days after Fazli used an exercise bar to batter her multiple times on the head, and Roslinda reportedly did not intervene. Fazli, an auxiliary police officer, and Roslinda were both arrested and charged with murder after the girl's death came to light. Eventually, the charges of murder against the couple were downgraded to manslaughter and multiple other counts of child abuse; Roslinda became the first person to be charged with allowing the death of her daughter in the same household, pursuant to a new law aimed to curb child abuse since 2020. After pleading guilty to their respective charges, the couple was sentenced in February 2024 to jail terms ranging from seven years to nearly 16 years, with Fazli additionally given 12 strokes of the cane for the manslaughter of his stepdaughter.

== Background ==
The girl was born in Singapore in 2009 when her mother, Roslinda Jamil, was only 16 years old. Roslinda had the child with her then-boyfriend, whose identity was unknown. The girl grew up under her mother's care, and Roslinda had to work as a cashier, a clerk, a food delivery rider and an early childhood assistant teacher to support herself and her daughter. Roslinda married her first husband in 2013, and had two more sons, but the first husband was reportedly abusive. Roslinda eventually filed for divorce at and had joint custody of her sons. Roslinda later met an auxiliary police officer named Mohamad Fazli Selamat, and they began their romantic relationship in May 2019 before moving in together in October 2019. Fazli and Roslinda married in April 2020, and Roslinda gave birth to Fazli's first and only biological child - a son - in August 2020. Roslinda's daughter, as well as Roslinda's two sons from her first marriage, went to live with their mother and stepfather at a flat in Jurong.

From March to November 2020, the girl was abused by her stepfather and mother. According to court documents and the couple's statements, Fazli was unhappy with his stepdaughter for eating slowly and believed that the girl had misbehaved and stolen items from their home. On one day in March 2020, Fazli punished the girl by ordering her to stand on a table and hold a 1.5-litre water bottle at shoulder level, and while she did so, Fazli used a belt and cane to beat her for 20 to 30 minutes, resulting in her sustaining multiple bruises on her arms, buttocks, thighs and legs. A few days after the violent assault, Fazli's family members discovered the bruises and they scolded Fazli for abusing the girl and Roslinda for not stopping him, but the abuse continued. As part of the ill-treatment, Fazli made the girl perform physical exercises as punishment. Fazli would often use items such as a wooden backscratcher, an exercise bar and a cane to beat her whenever she misbehaved, such as sleeping instead of studying or making errors while doing her homework. Fazli and Roslinda would force the victim to eat chilli padi until she vomited to punish her. On one occasion, Roslinda also scalded her daughter with hot water, causing blisters to the child's skin.

Between 26 August and 28 October 2020, the child did not go to school because Fazli and Roslinda feared that the abuse would be discovered by the teachers, which may in turn lead to retribution from the authorities. Two school representatives arrived on 26 September 2020 to visit the girl and check on her, but the couple did not allow them to enter, thus narrowly evading detection of the abuse. On 15 October 2020, a student welfare officer from the school managed to persuade the girl's parents to let them have a video call with the girl, and an officer from the Child Protective Service (CPS) accompanied the welfare officer throughout the call, which the girl made inside a room of her flat with dim lighting. During the call, the CPS officer did not notice any signs of abuse from the victim, who was then wearing long-sleeved clothes and the room itself was poorly lit.

== Death of the victim ==
On 6 November 2020, Fazli noticed that his stepdaughter was again eating her food slowly and, feeling incensed at the sight of this, Fazli repeatedly used the exercise bar to bludgeon the girl on the head until she fell unconscious. Roslinda witnessed the assault but did not intervene. After the assault, Fazli tried to wake her up by sprinkling water on her face, reciting prayers and repeatedly calling her, and two minutes later, the girl responded and woke up. Fazli noticed that his stepdaughter was bleeding from her right ear and her head was swollen, and this caused him to panic and realize that she required medical attention. Although Fazli and his wife discussed whether to take the girl to hospital, they decided to not do so, as they could not come up with an excuse to explain the injuries she sustained. While Fazli was out for work, the girl felt dizzy and vomited on her mattress.

During the early morning of 7 November 2020, Roslinda found that her daughter had blood in her ear, and informed her husband about it, but Fazli told her that it was nothing. Later that day, after Fazli returned home, he and his wife discovered bruises on the victim's arms and back. Fazli asked his stepdaughter to clench and unclench her fists repeatedly, and while the child complied, she avoided using her right hand. Fazli was enraged at this as he wanted his stepdaughter to use her right hand as well to "recover faster through better blood circulation", and wanted the girl to get into a push-up position to discipline her, but the victim was unable to do so and kept falling. This provoked Fazli into grabbing the exercise bar and used it to beat her on the back.

Two days later, on 9 November 2020, the girl cried out in pain when her mother massaged her arms, and Roslinda reportedly bit her thrice to stop her from crying. The victim was found to be in a grim and weak state when Fazli returned home from work, and Fazli apologized to her for the assault. The girl's situation worsened the following day and she told her mother that she was in pain and feeling dizzy. At around 10.20am on that morning itself, the girl tried to stand up but she failed to and she collapsed on the floor, becoming unresponsive. Roslinda tried to wake her daughter up and even slapped her face, but the girl did not respond. Roslinda sought the help of her neighbour, who noticed that Roslinda's daughter did not show any signs of life when checking her pulse. An ambulance was later contacted and paramedics rushed the girl to Ng Teng Fong General Hospital. In spite of efforts to revive her, the 11-year-old girl was pronounced dead at 12:40 pm. At the time of her death, the deceased was about 1.34m tall and weighed about 20 kg, and an autopsy report revealed that there were multiple injuries on the girl, which included skull and rib fractures, bite marks, bruises all over her body, and blunt force injuries on her head, face, chest, hips and limbs. The cause of death was the fatal head injuries sustained by the girl as a result of the exercise bar attack inflicted upon her by her stepfather.

== Murder charge ==
Shortly after the death of the girl at Ng Teng Fong General Hospital, the police were alerted to the unnatural death, and they arrested both Roslinda Jamil and Mohamad Fazli Selamat on suspicion of causing the death of the victim. Although Fazli and Roslinda initially lied to the hospital authorities, saying that the girl had fallen down the stairs while she was skateboarding a few days prior to her death, both of them eventually confessed during police interrogation that they were responsible for murdering the girl. On 11 November 2020, the police released a media statement in relation to the girl's murder, and announced that the couple would be charged in court the following day with murder.

On 12 November 2020, Mohamad Fazli Selamat and Roslinda Jamil, both 26 years old, were charged with the murder of the 11-year-old girl. As the charge of murder faced by the couple was of one with common intention, which was under Section 302(1) read with Section 34 of the Penal Code, if they were found guilty, both Roslinda and Fazli would be sentenced to death. A court order was imposed to prohibit the media from naming the victim publicly, as well as both Roslinda and Fazli, to protect the identity of the girl's brothers. In court, after the charge sheet was presented to them, Roslinda and Fazli reportedly asked for bail and wanted to see their children, and Roslinda stated her oldest son was about to start Primary One the following year and she needed to complete the necessary documents to facilitate his schooling. Although this request was denied due to the law prohibiting murder suspects from being granted bail in Singapore, District Judge Tan Jen Tse informed the couple that their requests would be accordingly processed and provided the necessary assistance by the investigating officer.

After their indictment, both Fazli and Roslinda were detained on remand without bail while awaiting trial for the homicide. The couple were also remanded into police custody for one week after their indictment to assist in investigations, and the police would also re-visit the scene of crime and recover evidence. Also, the two sons from Roslinda's previous marriage were placed under the care of her ex-husband, while the couple's biological son was arranged for under foster care.

== Trial and sentencing ==
=== Plea of guilt ===
On 27 February 2023, both 28-year-old Mohamad Fazli Selamat and 29-year-old Roslinda Jamil stood trial at the High Court for killing the 11-year-old girl, and the trial was presided over by Justice Pang Khang Chau. By then, the charges of murder against both Roslinda and Fazli had been reduced to lesser offences relating to the abuse and death of the girl, which allowed them to avoid the death penalty for murdering the girl. Fazli pleaded guilty to five counts of child abuse and one count of manslaughter, and consented to have the remaining 11 other charges taken into consideration during sentencing, while Roslinda pleaded guilty to two counts of child abuse and one count of allowing the unlawful death of her daughter in the same household. Roslinda was the first person since 2020 to be convicted of allowing the death of a child in the same household, in accordance to a newly enacted law under the Children and Young Persons Act (CYPA).

=== Submissions ===
On 5 July 2023, the defence and prosecution began to make submissions on sentence. The prosecution, led by Deputy Public Prosecutor (DPP) Ng Jun Chong, Jonathan Lee and Kumaresan Gohulabalan, sought a sentence of eight to 12 years’ jail for Roslinda on the grounds that her inaction was one of the main causes of her daughter's death, and should she have intervened, the death of her daughter would have been averted. For Fazli, the prosecution was seeking 14 to 17 years’ jail and at least 12 strokes of the cane, describing the fatal attack on the victim as an "unprovoked, persistent and callous" attack that was unwarranted and disproportionate to a simple and trivial matter.

In mitigation, the defence asked the court to show leniency to the couple on account of them being past victims of abuse. Mohamed Muzammil Mohamed, a veteran criminal lawyer who represented Roslinda, stated that his client had been abused by her mother, who would often lock her in a storeroom, and Roslinda herself was a victim of school bullying during her younger years, and she had to leave school at the age of 15 while in Secondary Three, and even attempted suicide once. Mohamed also stated after being impregnated by her then-boyfriend and became a single mom at the age of 16, Roslinda had to juggle between various jobs to support herself and her eldest child, who was the victim in this case, and that her first marriage was unhappy due to her first husband abusing her emotionally and physically. Mohamed asked the court to show Roslinda mercy so his client could reunite with her children after serving her sentence. Mohamed also stated that Roslinda was less culpable than Fazli, since Fazli was the one who was responsible for most of the abuse; at most, Roslinda disciplined her daughter for lying, stealing and other misbehaviours. When her spouse was abusing her daughter, Roslinda was busy taking care of the other children, and Mohamed pointed out that Fazli picked only on the girl even though the girl's brothers had the same issue of eating slowly.

As for Fazli, his lawyer Ahmad Nizam Abbas conceded that there was no excuse for his client's actions but he implored the court to consider the background of his client, who was also a victim of childhood abuse. Ahmad Nizam presented a psychiatrist's report, which found that Fazli, who was the second eldest in a financially poor family of nine children to a rubbish collector and a housewife, had undergone constant abuse at the age of six, and as a result, Fazli was more vulnerable to being an abuser himself because of his history as a victim of child abuse. More details of Fazli's background also came to light: he was nine years old when his parents disappeared for a prolonged period of time and left the children to fend for themselves; due to the abuse, Fazli was separated from his siblings, and he often had to live under foster care. Ahmad Nizam also argued that with little to no experience in marriage and parenting, Fazli's marriage to a woman with three children like Roslinda herself meant he had to quickly transition from a single man to a husband and parent immediately, which made him feel intimidated. He wanted to be a good father to his three stepchildren to take care of them, but this desire was hampered and distorted by his experiences of child abuse and adoption. To sum up his mitigation, Ahmad Nizam stated that Fazli was remorseful for murdering his stepdaughter and he unreservedly accepted the deplorable nature of his actions and his responsibility behind the killing.

=== Sentence ===
On 15 February 2024, Justice Pang Khang Chau delivered his verdict on sentence. He ruled that Roslinda Jamil, then 30 years old, should be incarcerated for a period of seven years, eight months and three weeks. As for 29-year-old Mohamed Fazli Selamat, Justice Pang sentenced him to 15 years and 11 months' imprisonment, as well as giving him 12 strokes of the cane.

During the sentencing hearing, the prosecution applied for the gag order on the identities of the couple to be lifted, given that the trial proceedings had concluded and there was no need to withhold the personal particulars of the couple. The prosecution explained that the gag orders had been imposed in the first place to protect the victim's siblings if they were called to trial as witnesses, pursuant to the Children and Young Persons Act (CYPA), and this no longer applied because the couple's surviving children were not summoned to testify in court. Despite the opposition from the defence, Justice Pang agreed with the prosecution's submission and allowed the offenders to be named publicly, although the girl's identity was not revealed out of consideration for the privacy of her three brothers.

== Societal impact ==
The 2020 Jurong child killing was the third alleged murder of a young girl at the hands of her parents to occur in Singapore within a year. Prior to this case, in September 2019, the burnt remains of a 30-month-old girl named Umaisyah were discovered in a pot at her parents' Chin Swee Road flat, and both of the parents, who were initially charged with murder, were jailed between 14 and 21.5 years with caning for the father on charges of child abuse and manslaughter. The second case occurred in February 2020, when four-year-old Megan Khung Yu Wai was allegedly killed by her mother and the mother's boyfriend, who both burnt her corpse with a friend's help three months after the murder. The couple and the same friend were all arrested in July 2020 and charged with murder, and the couple were given long prison sentences for varied charges of manslaughter and child abuse.

The 2020 Jurong child killing, together with several other high-profile cases of children abused to death, including the 2014 Chin Swee Road child death, the 2016 Toa Payoh child abuse case and the 2017 Ayeesha child abuse case, brought widespread attention to the phenomenon of child abuse in Singapore, and it prompted the government to impose stricter measures to ensure the safeguard of child welfare and curb child abuse. On 23 September 2023, five months before the sentencing of the Jurong child abusers, CNA reporter Alison Jenner wrote an exclusive article to touch on the subject of child abuse and cited the aforementioned cases as the examples. She reported that there was difficulty for people to detect the warning signs of child abuse (which is a persistent social issue worldwide and often happens behind closed doors) and the challenges of welfare groups to uncover these cases, regardless of whether the victims died or survived. Jenner also stated it was the collective responsibility of every member of society to raise alarm and notice these cases and safeguard the children's welfare. Jenner also brought up statistical data by the Child Protective Service (CPS), which had investigated 2,141 abuse cases in 2021, an increase of 63 per cent from the 1,313 cases in 2020. Jenner ended her writing of the article by stating that the child abuse cases should highlight the need for a more vigilant community and remind people of the importance of protecting children from abuse.

Five months after the sentencing of Fazli and Roslinda, the 2020 Jurong child killing was again mentioned in July 2024 when the offence of allowing the death of a child by abuse once again became a topic of public discussion. It was mentioned by legal professionals that charges for such an offence could be used against a suspected child abuser whenever more than one person was involved but also carried the uncertainty of whoever was more culpable, so as to curb the child abuse case and also punish parents who could have had the ability to prevent the abuse of their child or children but chose to not do so. It was often noted that in such cases, a biological parent or step-parent was involved whenever two or more were facing charges for child abuse that resulted in death. More frequently, the parent who allowed the death was overwhelmingly a woman. Experts and welfare individuals stated that the women would often hesitate to step in whenever these instances of abuse happened, as the women would fear retaliation or further violence may come down on themselves or their children and also feared that their children would be removed from the household if reports of the abuse were lodged. As of July 2024, Roslinda was the first and only person to be convicted of the crime, and there were two more cases, one reported in 2022 and another in 2023 respectively; both these cases are presently pending before the courts.

In light of the sentencing of Megan Khung's mother and her boyfriend, who both abused and murdered the girl back in 2020, the 2020 Jurong child killing was recalled as one of at least eight most high-profile cases of child abuse resulting in death that happened in Singapore between 2015 and 2023.

== See also ==
- Caning in Singapore
- Yishun infant murder
- Death of Megan Khung
- Ayeesha child abuse case
- Chin Swee Road child death
- 2016 Toa Payoh child abuse case
- List of major crimes in Singapore
