= Chin Swee Road child death =

2014 case of a girl who was abused and killed by her parents

- The Chin Swee Road flat where Umaisyah's skeletal remains was discovered. Toys and flowers were placed outside the flat by sympathizers as condolences to the late Umaisyah
- Date: March 2014 – September 2019
- Location: Chin Swee Road, Tiong Bahru, Singapore
- Outcome: Two-year-old Umaisyah allegedly murdered in March 2014; Body of Umaisyah discovered five years later on 10 September 2019 by the Umaisyah uncle; Parents of Umaisyah charged with murder in September 2019; Umaisyah's mother discharged, but faced other charges of child abuse; Umaisyah's father sentenced to 21 1/2 years' jail and caning for manslaughter and other charges; Umaisyah's mother pleaded guilty to charges of abusing her children and perverting justice.; Umaisyah's mother sentenced to 14 years in jail
- Deaths: "Umaisyah" (full name unknown)
- Injuries: None
- Convicted: Umaisyah's father (real name unknown); Umaisyah's mother (real name unknown)
- Verdict: Guilty
- Convictions: Culpable homicide not amounting to murder (one count; Umaisyah's father); Multiple other charges (Umaisyah's father); Child abuse (Umaisyah's mother); Perverting the course of justice (Umaisyah's mother)
- Sentence: 21 1/2 years' imprisonment and 18 strokes of the cane (Umaisyah's father); 14 years' imprisonment (Umaisyah's mother)

Known as the Chin Swee Road child death case, the charred skeletal remains of a 30-month-old girl, whose given name was Umaisyah (c. July or August 2011 – c. March 2014), were first discovered hidden and sealed inside one of the metal cooking pots from a flat in Chin Swee Road on 10 September 2019. After they uncovered the identity of Umaisyah's remains, the police found that her parents, who used to reside in the flat, were likely responsible for killing the girl five years before in March 2014. The cause of Umaisyah's death was due to her father slapping her on the face a few times with great force, which resulted in a traumatic brain injury that led to a brain seizure, causing Umaisyah to die and her parents, who did not seek medical help for her, burnt the body to avoid detection of their daughter's death and abuse and the father's drug use.

Upon the discovery of the girl's death in 2019, Umaisyah's parents, who themselves were in prison serving sentences or pending trial for unrelated offences since 2018, were both charged with murder. The victim and couple cannot be named due to the courts issuing a gag order in 2019 to protect the identities of their other children (who were still alive), although the gag order was partially lifted in 2023 to allow the media to report only Umaisyah's given name but other details like her own surname or her parents' identities are not revealed in the media.

Eventually, Umaisyah's father was found guilty of a reduced charge of manslaughter and three other charges unrelated to Umaisyah's killing in September 2023, and he was jailed for 21 1/2 years with caning (18 strokes). Umaisyah's mother, who received a discharge not amounting to an acquittal for murdering Umaisyah, was sentenced to 14 years' imprisonment in February 2024 on charges of abusing her children and perverting the course of justice.

== Discovery of human remains ==
Umaisyah's parents were previously convicted of drug offences and were imprisoned, leading to Umaisyah's siblings being taken care by relatives or social services. As a result, Umaisyah's intellectually-disabled uncle lived alone in the family house.

On 10 September 2019, during one of the visitations by a friend who was taking care of Umaisyah's uncle, he opened a box inside the house out of curiosity and discovered the charred body of a child. Frightened by it, the man left the house leaving the box opened.

Unable to differentiate between edible food and the body, Umaisyah's uncle put the body into a metal cooking pot and started cooking it, resulting in a pungent smell which alerted the neighbours. The neighbours called the police, who arrived at the flat and impounded the metal cooking pot and the human remains as evidence, as they classified the case as one of unnatural death.

== Investigations ==
Through first-stage investigations, the police found that the human remains did not belong to a fetus, but it belonged to a girl aged approximately 30 months old, or equivalent to two years and six months of age. Her first name was reportedly Umaisyah. Her parents were the brother and sister-in-law of the man who found the corpse inside the kitchen, and it was further established that Umaisyah died five years prior in March 2014, and her parents, who had five more children, were likely responsible for her death, and had possibly burned the body in order to conceal her death.

According to police investigations, Umaisyah's parents, who themselves were already in prison charged with unrelated offences by September 2019, had lied to the social service agencies that the girl, whose birth was registered, was placed under the care of their relatives, even though there were confirmation that their other children were being taken care of by relatives, friends or social services. Their case was well known to the community agencies in the neighbourhood. On 9 September 2019, the day before the girl's corpse was found, Umaisyah's mother was sentenced to five years and two months' imprisonment for a total of four charges of drug-related offences and theft. The father was remanded since June 2018 for charges of rioting and consumption of methamphetamine.

== Criminal charges ==
On 16 September 2019, a week after the discovery of Umaisyah's skeleton, reports revealed that the girl's biological parents were arrested for their involvement in the case, now known as the "Chin Swee Road murder" case in the media. The parents and the girl were not named due to a court gag order issued to protect the identity of her surviving siblings. Under the law, the death penalty would be imposed in cases of offenders found guilty of murder. The authorities gave assurance that the victim's siblings were still safe and under stable care.

On 17 September 2019, the couple, who were both Singaporeans, were officially charged with murder at the State Courts for allegedly murdering their two-year-old daughter. Umaisyah's 31-year-old father, who was awaiting trial for the other three charges, was given a remand order on 24 September 2019 to undergo psychiatric evaluation for killing his daughter. Umaisyah's 30-year-old mother, who had already begun serving her sentence of five years and two months, was ordered on 1 October 2019 by the district judge to be remanded in Changi Prison's Complex Medical Centre for three weeks for psychiatric observation. The Attorney-General's Chambers warned members of the public to not breach the gag order, after some people published purported photographs of the girl's parents and family members, which amounted to a potential risk of identifying the victim or anyone related to her. Anyone who breached the gag order could be jailed up to a year, fined a maximum of S$5,000, or both.

On 5 February 2021, two years after the couple were charged with murder, the prosecution, having reviewed the evidence and case thoroughly, decided to apply for a discharge not amounting to an acquittal for Umaisyah's mother with respect to killing her daughter, meaning that the murder charge would be temporarily set aside, with the possibility to revive it should new evidence surface. Umaisyah's mother's lawyers objected to the prosecution's decision, as they sought a full acquittal of the murder charge, which would mean Umaisyah's mother cannot be prosecuted for the same offence again. On the other hand, the prosecution confirmed that they would proceed with the original murder charge against Umaisyah's father.

On 2 March 2021, Umaisyah's mother was granted a discharge not amounting to an acquittal for murdering her daughter. She, together with her husband, were also charged with 12 counts of having abused the victim and their other surviving children, perverting the course of justice, as well as giving false information to the social welfare agencies in relation to the girl's whereabouts. The mother was offered a S$80,000 bail in November 2021.

== Trial of Umaisyah's father ==
=== Plea of guilt and conviction ===
On 19 September 2023, more than nine years after Umaisyah was murdered, and four years after he was arrested, Umaisyah's father, who by then divorced his wife, stood trial at the High Court for killing his daughter back in March 2014. After submitting a plea of guilt, Umaisyah's father was accordingly found guilty of one reduced charge of culpable homicide not amounting to murder (equivalent to manslaughter) by causing Umaisyah's death and failing to seek medical attention for her. The accused also pleaded guilty to another three charges, consisting of one count of rioting, one count of drug consumption and one count of abusing his six-year-old stepson. Another five charges were consented by Umaisyah's father to be taken into consideration during sentencing.

In the midst of the man's trial, which took place on the same date, the court heard the full sequence of events that happened up till the killing, and the post-killing events prior to the 2019 discovery of Umaisyah's remains.

=== Account ===
The following were the full sequence of events prior to, during and after Umaisyah's death, according to court documents and the media's coverage of Umaisyah's father's trial.

After her birth during that same year, Umaisyah was sent away in November 2011 to undergo foster care at the age of three or four months, after her father was imprisoned at a drug rehabilitation centre and her mother was deemed unsuitable as a caretaker of the girl. Umaisyah only reunited with her parents one year and six months after she was placed under foster care, but she was abused by her parents, who likewise neglected and mistreated their other five children, two of whom were a son (the same boy whom Umaisyah's father was found guilty of abusing) and daughter from Umaisyah's mother's first marriage. The six children (aged between two and nine in 2014) were also not given adequate food and water, and they were often left uncared for by their parents. Umaisyah was said to have been beaten frequently with a hanger or a belt by her father, who also punched her thigh or pinched her. When Umaisyah's foster mother came to visit the girl in July and August 2013, she noticed that the girl became withdrawn and less communicative, which was a result of Umaisyah's parents abusing her (a truth which Umaisyah's foster mother did not realize).

The exact date of Umaisyah's death in March 2014 remains unclear, but on that day, Umaisyah, then 30 months old, was caught playing with her faeces after soiling her diaper. Umaisyah's parents were upset at the sight of it, and Umaisyah's mother moved forward to slap her daughter on the cheeks and flicked her lips despite the girl's cries. Umaisyah's father, who had just consumed methamphetamine earlier that morning, slapped the girl on the face two to three times with great force, so much so that the girl bled from her nose and mouth, and gasped for air and could not walk. According to prosecutors, the slaps by Umaisyah's father likely resulted in a traumatic brain injury that caused Umaisyah to have a brain seizure. Despite Umaisyah's father attempting to resuscitate her multiple times, Umaisyah remained unresponsive. For fear that their acts of abuse and other acts of consuming drugs might get discovered, Umaisyah's parents remained silent and never sought medical attention despite the graveness of Umaisyah's injuries, and they left the girl to die.

Upon the death of Umaisyah, her parents placed her body in a metal pot and set her body on fire in the back of her father's lorry, and the corpse was fully burnt before the pot was placed in a box, which was sealed with masking tape and covered with cling wrap. The box itself was placed under the kitchen stove in their flat, and Umaisyah's parents even warned her maternal uncle to never touch the box, although at one point in 2017, he nearly threw the box away after finding it dirty and having cockroach eggs on the cling wrap, before Umaisyah's mother stopped him, and had the box freshly wrapped before putting it back below the kitchen stove, and warned her brother to not touch the box again. It was only after the sentencing of Umaisyah's mother in 2019 when her uncle finally uncovered his niece's remains and showed it to his sister's friends, who made a police report, which led to Umaisyah's death coming to light five years after it occurred.

Aside from this, Umaisyah's parents also made many lies and attempts to cover up their daughter's death. One instance was in December 2017, when the Ministry of Education (MOE) contacted her parents after finding that Umaisyah was not registered for Primary 1, the couple lied that they entrusted the girl to the care of her foster parents or the father's relatives in Melaka, Malaysia but had no idea of her whereabouts. Umaisyah's parents also drifted apart during these five years, and her father left their matrimonial home in 2017, and he no longer lived with his wife since then. Umaisyah's father was subsequently jailed at a drug rehabilitation centre for the second time, but he absconded in February 2018 before completing his sentence and he went on to commit an act of rioting while on the run, before he was arrested in April 2018 for the offence, and he even continued to consume methamphetamine while out on bail for the rioting charge, resulting in his arrest and remand in prison on 19 June 2018.

According to Dr Paul Chui, who conducted an autopsy on Umaisyah, he stated that the corpse was severely charred and he could not identify any facial features or the limbs of the girl, and he was unable to determine the cause of death or the exact time of death. Dr Chui also said that the damage caused by the fire and the advanced state of decomposition rendered him incapable of finding any external injury on Umaisyah. Only a few bone fragments and teeth could be recovered from the corpse, according to the prosecutors.

=== Submissions, judge's remarks and sentencing ===
On 19 September 2023, the same date of Umaisyah's father's conviction, the prosecution, led by Wong Woon Kwong, sought a sentence of between 20 1/2 years and 21 1/2 years' imprisonment and 18 strokes of the cane, highlighting the aggravating factors of the case, including the absence of remorse from Umaisyah's father for killing her and his continued acts of committing crimes during the next few years after killing Umaisyah, and therefore, the prosecution urged the court to impose the sentence they asked for in his case. On the other hand, Umaisyah's father's defence counsel, led by Ramesh Tiwary, requested for a sentence lower than what the prosecution argued for on account that the killing was unpremeditated and done out of a spontaneous spur of rage and stated that the accused accepted his responsibility for what happened. During the court hearing, Justice Aedit Abdullah, who was the presiding judge of Umaisyah's father's trial, reportedly inquired the prosecution on why the case itself took five years since the accused's arrest in 2018 to arrive at the courts for trial hearing, and the prosecution replied that extensive investigations had to be taken due to the severe state of decomposition and damage to the girl's corpse, which hindered the forensic experts' process in identifying the cause of death and reconstruct the events.

After a short adjournment of the court session, Justice Abdullah returned with his verdict on sentence. The judge admonished Umaisyah's father for the "callous, vicious and heinous" abuse of Umaisyah and having caused her to die at the young age of two, which deprived Umaisyah of the chance to grow up and lead a fulfilling life, and also commented that Umaisyah would have had a chance to live should her parents sought medical help for her. Not only did Justice Abdullah reject the defence's mitigation plea, but he also rebuffed the man's claim that he had found solace in religion. In response, he personally addressed Umaisyah's father, saying that this was irrelevant to the court and that it was his duty to impose punishment on Umaisyah's father, while this religious matter was between "(Umaisyah's father) and His Maker". For the first time, Justice Abdullah addressed Umaisyah by her given name and allowed the gag order to be partially lifted and permitted the media to report her given name, reasoning that Umaisyah should be remembered by her name, instead of being remembered as "the child who was killed by her father; whose body was burnt by her parents; and whose charred remains were kept in a pot by them". Despite this, Umaisyah's surname and her parents' identities, as well as the address of their home, were not revealed out of consideration to protect the identities of her siblings.

In his own words, Justice Abdullah made a remark out of sympathy for the girl:

"Umaisyah deserved so much more."

After this, Justice Abdullah, having regarded the killing of Umaisyah as one of the "worst cases of culpable homicide", stated that the aggravating factors of the case and the tendency of her father to resort to violence in Umaisyah's case and other incidents had outweighed the mitigating value of the defendant's guilty plea, and his conduct was "so reprehensible" that the judge decided that leniency was unwarranted in his case.

Therefore, for the four charges Umaisyah's father was convicted of, Justice Abdullah imposed the following sentences:

1. Ten years' imprisonment and 12 strokes of the cane for one count of culpable homicide not amounting to murder under Section 304(b) of the Penal Code (PC).
2. Six years' imprisonment and three strokes of the cane for one count of consuming methamphetamine under Section 8(b)(ii) of the Misuse of Drugs Act.
3. 30 months' imprisonment and three strokes of the cane for one count of rioting under Section 147 of the PC.
4. Three years' imprisonment for one count of child abuse under the Children and Young Persons Act (CYPA).

All the above four jail terms were ordered to run consecutively, and in total, Umaisyah's father, then 35 years old, was sentenced to 21 1/2 years in prison and 18 strokes of the cane, which was the exact maximum punishment sought by the prosecution. His sentence was backdated to 1 July 2018.

== Trial of Umaisyah's mother ==
As of the time when her husband was convicted of causing their daughter's death, Umaisyah's mother faced a total of twelve charges, including those of child abuse, perverting the course of justice and for giving false information to the authorities, and she is still under a discharge not amounting to an acquittal for murdering Umaisyah.

On 7 February 2024, nearly ten years after she murdered her daughter, Umaisyah's mother, then 35 years old, pleaded guilty to four charges of abusing her children and perverting justice, and the remaining eight charges were taken into consideration during sentencing. The prosecution, led by Deputy Public Prosecutors Wong Woon Kwong, Norine Tan and Phoebe Tan, sought a jail term of between 14 years and 14 1/2 years, describing the offences as "entirely motivated out of self-interest" for the mother and her husband to cover up their tracks for more than five years and as a mother, the offender had been an irresponsible and neglectful parent who abused her children, and even continued to abuse and neglect her children despite the multiple warnings she received from the Child Protection Services, even after she and her husband murdered Umaisyah.

The woman's defence counsel (led by Pramnath Vijayakumar and Sadhana Rai), however, asked for a lower sentence of ten years plus another ten or 11 months on behalf of the accused, who was reportedly a former victim of child abuse, including an instance when she was nearly molested by her stepfather at age 13, and these experiences of abuse could have influenced the defendant into becoming the parent she was to her own children, although the District Judge Toh Han Li pointed out that just because Umaisyah's mother was a victim of abuse in the past, it cannot become a justification for her to neglect and ill-treat her children.

On the same date when she submitted her plea of guilt, Umaisyah's mother was sentenced to 14 years' imprisonment. District Judge Toh Han Li said during his sentencing remarks that he rejected the defendant's claims of being abused in the past, and he stated that there were past instances of abuse where Umaisyah's mother had committed more serious abuse than Umaisyah's father, such as feeding Umaisyah and her brother some chilli padi, and her responsibility behind the abuse in totality was not lesser than her husband. Aside from this, District Judge Toh added that Umaisyah's mother was not a passive follower in the concealment of Umaisyah's death, because her actions were motivated by self-preservation and that she had “every intention to prevent the machinery of justice”, as demonstrated by her numerous times of stopping her brother from opening the rotten box (which contained Umaisyah's charred corpse).

District Judge Toh pointed out that Umaisyah's mother did not uphold the maternal duty as a mother and inflicted severe abuse on them. He also stated that when Umaisyah was on the verge of dying, her mother chose to turn a blind eye and leave her to die, and even took steps to hide the truth, and it thus turned into an irreversible tragedy. Since Umaisyah's mother was placed under remand right after completing her previous sentence for drug consumption, her 14-year sentence was ordered to take effect from the date of her remand, which was on 16 November 2021.

== Case effect ==
The Chin Swee Road child murder shocked the whole of Singapore when it first came to light in September 2019, due to the unusual circumstances of the case. Several people went to the flat to place toys and gifts outside, to pay respects and show sympathy to the deceased victim. Several members of the public also called for justice to be served. Member of Parliament (MP) Lily Neo expressed her condolences to Umaisyah. The case also became a topic of discussion on Parliament with regards to the authorities' failure of not detecting the death of Umaisyah at an earlier stage.

There were intentions by the government to strengthen network of agencies and community organisations to provide better care for welfare of children without stable caregivers. For cases of children "without alternative caregivers" or had safety concerns during their operations, these children will be referred to the Ministry of Social and Family Development (MSF), who would ensure the children be placed under stable care arrangements.

On 23 September 2023, four days after the sentencing of Umaisyah's father for killing her, CNA's reporter Alison Jenner wrote an exclusive article to touch on the subject of child abuse, citing the Umaisyah case and several other high-profile cases of child abuse and murder in Singapore, including the 2016 Toa Payoh child abuse case (where a five-year-old boy's parents were sentenced to life imprisonment for murdering and abusing him), the murder trial of a man who abused his daughter to death in 2017 and a 2020 case of a girl killed by her stepfather. She wrote about the difficulty for people to detect the warning signs of child abuse (which is a persistent social issue worldwide and happens behind closed doors) and the challenges of welfare groups to uncover these cases (whether or not they ended with the child's death) it was also the collective responsibility of society to detect these cases and ensure the safeguard of the children's welfare. Jenner also stated that statistics showed that the Child Protective Service (CPS) had investigated 2,141 abuse cases in 2021, an increase of 63 per cent from the 1,313 cases in 2020. Jenner ended her writing of the article by stating that the case of Umaisyah should highlight the need for a more vigilant community and remind people of the importance of protecting children from abuse.

In the same month of Umaisyah's father's sentencing, the Ministry of Social and Family Development's (MSF) stated that per the arrangements of CPS, Umaisyah's five siblings were all placed under alternative care through their relatives and friends, foster care or children's home, and the CPS were continually providing support for her siblings since 2019. No other details were provided due to the case of Umaisyah's mother, who was still pending trial at that point of time. In February 2024, it was further revealed that Umaisyah was not under the care of social agencies at the time of her death, and her parents defaulted on appointments with the Family Service Centre and refused their request to help the family. Since Umaisyah's death, the MSF also "reviewed and strengthened information sharing and coordination protocols" to ensure the protection of young, vulnerable children, including the practice of regular safety checks on such children.

Within a year since the discovery of Umaisyah's death, there were two more high-profile murders of young girls whose parent(s) were charged with murdering them. One of them was the case of Megan Khung Yu Wai, a four-year-old girl who was allegedly killed by her mother and the mother's boyfriend in February 2020 before having her corpse burned three months later; the couple were eventually caught and charged in July 2020. Another was an eleven-year-old schoolgirl who was allegedly killed by her stepfather and mother, who were both arrested and charged in November 2020. Khung's mother and her boyfriend were sentenced to 19 years' jail and 30 years' jail with 17 strokes of the cane respectively for the abuse and manslaughter of Khung, while the second case of the eleven-year-old girl proceeded in the trial court with the stepfather Mohamad Fazli Selamat (who was a former auxiliary policeman) imprisoned for 15 years and 11 months with 12 strokes of the cane on a reduced charge of manslaughter by using an exercise bar to fatally hit the victim, and the mother Roslinda Jamil spending seven years, eight months and three weeks behind bars for abusing the victim and failing to protect the girl from the fatal assault.

In May 2024, Law Minister K Shanmugam, who touched on the topic of the death penalty during a parliamentary session, stated that the death penalty remains as an important tool in Singapore's war on drugs to deter drug trafficking and decrease the rate of drug consumption, and cited the numerous instances where drugs had caused harm to countless harm and led to many drug addicts committing heinous crimes that shook society to the core. The case of Umaisyah's father, who consumed methamphetamine prior to killing his daughter, was cited as one of these high-profile cases where the destructive effect of drugs had been the root cause of tragedies and serious crimes in society.

The Chin Swee Road murder case was considered one of the high-profile cases of familicides (also including the Woodlands double murders and the ITE College Central murder) that occurred in Singapore in recent years.

== See also ==
- Caning in Singapore
- Capital punishment in Singapore
- List of major crimes in Singapore
- List of solved missing person cases (2010s)
