= Yishun infant murder =

2019 death of a nine-month-old boy in Singapore

- Izz Fayyaz Zayani Ahmad, the nine-month-old victim
- Date: 8 November 2019
- Location: Yishun, Singapore
- Outcome: Aliff was found guilty of murdering the baby; Aliff had lost his appeal against his conviction; Aliff is serving one term of life imprisonment at Changi Prison
- Deaths: Izz Fayyaz Zayani Ahmad
- Injuries: None
- Convicted: Mohamed Aliff Mohamed Yusoff
- Verdict: Guilty
- Convictions: Murder under Section 300(c) of the Penal Code (one count)
- Sentence: Life imprisonment and fifteen strokes of the cane

On 8 November 2019, a nine-month-old baby boy named Izz Fayyaz Zayani Ahmad was murdered by 27-year-old Mohamed Aliff Mohamed Yusoff, the boyfriend of Izz's mother, who had Izz from her former marriage. Aliff was said to have inflicted traumatic head injuries on the boy by slamming his head against the floorboard of his newly bought van, and these injuries caused bleeding to the brain, which resulted in Izz's death, according to the autopsy report. Aliff tried to cover up his crime but he was arrested and charged with voluntarily causing grievous hurt, though the charge sheet was amended with the prosecution upgrading the hurt-related charge to capital murder. Aliff was eventually found guilty of murdering Izz in July 2022, and a month later, he was sentenced to life imprisonment and fifteen strokes of the cane, after the judge found that Aliff's overall conduct did not deserve the death penalty.

== Pre-case background ==
The boy, Izz Fayyaz Zayani Ahmad, was born in January 2019. He was his mother Nadiah Abdul Jalil's first and only child from her first marriage with an unnamed man. His mother met her boyfriend Mohamed Aliff Mohamed Yusoff (born in late 1992) through Instagram in 2017 or 2018 and became romantically involved around September 2019. Prior to the murder, Aliff was working in a renovation-related job, and he planned to, together with Izz's mother and her brother, establish a delivery business and they bought a van together for this upcoming business. According to his sister Nur Atikah, Aliff was a hard-working person and he likes children, and he even helped take care of her daughter whenever she was at work. He reportedly also got along well with Izz during the time he was dating the boy's mother.

== Death and investigation ==
On 7 November 2019, Aliff and his girlfriend were having dinner at Wisteria Mall in Yishun, and Izz spilled his mother's drink during the couple's meal, which sparked an argument between her and Aliff about how to discipline the toddler. Later, the boy's mother agreed to let Aliff care for Izz overnight because she had to go to work the next day and her mother could not care for Izz, and hence, she passed Aliff a bag with some essential baby items, before she stayed overnight at her brother's flat in Jurong East, where it was nearer to her workplace.

After dropping his girlfriend off, Aliff wanted to bring Izz to his parents' flat at Yishun but since his father texted him that it was not convenient to bring the boy there due to other family members being present, Aliff kept the child with him for the night. However, at around midnight on 8 November, because of the baby's incessant crying and the prior spilling of the drink by Izz, Aliff became increasingly frustrated and thus slammed the baby on his head against the floorboard of his new van twice, which he bought earlier on the same day for his planned business. As a result of Aliff's assault on the boy, nine-month-old Izz Fayyaz Zayani Ahmad suffered fatal head injuries, which resulted in bleeding of the brain and he eventually died.

Later, Aliff drove to Jurong East and picked up Izz's mother, after he alerted her about what happened to her son, who was found lying motionless and cold and stopped breathing. Aliff, fearful of facing retribution from the authorities, claimed that while he was holding the baby in one arm while using another to hold groceries, Izz fidgeted in his grip and accidentally fell from his arm and hit his head on the floorboard twice. Aliff also tried to persuade Izz's mother to pay for someone to bury the dead child and report him missing a year later, but she refused to out of love and wanted to give her child a proper burial. Aliff agreed to bring the boy to hospital after spending some time aimlessly driving and they reached National University Hospital, where Izz was pronounced dead at 4.30 am on the morning of 8 November 2019.

Prior to that, Aliff tried to make the boy's mother tell the hospital authorities a consistent sequence of events that narrated the couple bringing the boy to hospital after he lost consciousness, and that Aliff had given CPR to Izz beforehand. Also, after reaching the hospital's car park, Aliff took time to clean himself up and brush his teeth, due to his fear of being caught and sent to prison over Izz's death, and also made a detour to discard his mobile phone in some bushes.

Shortly after Izz died, Aliff was arrested by the police for allegedly causing hurt to the nine-month-old boy. He was first charged with voluntarily causing grievous hurt, an offence under Section 325 of the Penal code that attracts the maximum punishment of ten years' imprisonment, with either caning or a fine. A week later, however, Aliff's hurt-related charge was upgraded to one of capital murder, which was punishable by death under Singapore law. He was remanded at the Central Police Division for investigations.

Two days after he died, on 10 November 2019, Izz was buried after an autopsy and subsequent funeral.

== Murder trial ==
=== Case hearing ===
On 5 April 2022, 29-year-old Mohamed Aliff Mohamed Yusoff was brought to trial at the High Court for the charge of murdering Izz Fayyaz Zayani Ahmad under Section 300(c) of the Penal Code, which dictates an offence of murder by intentionally inflicting an injury that results in death. If convicted, the possible sentence Aliff would face for a Section 300(c) murder charge was either the death penalty or life imprisonment with caning.

Aliff, who was defended by Kanagavijayan Nadarajan, argued in his defence that Izz's injuries were the result of an accidental fall. He also alleged that he faces threats from the police to own up to tell the truth by changing his story to avoid the death sentence, and that the police threatened the boy's mother (who was a trial witness) to incriminate him. The police officers and Izz's mother, in response, all also denied that there were any threats made against Aliff during his interrogation or questioning of witnesses. A psychiatric report by the Institute of Mental Health showed that Aliff was not of unsound mind at the time, and does not have any mental disorder or intellectual disability.

Other than that, the prosecution, consisting of Han Ming Kuang and Lim Shin Hui, highlighted that prior to his "accidental fall" story, Aliff made a first-hand confession of having intentionally caused the boy to suffer head injuries by pushing him against the van floorboard and showed regret for his crime. They argued that the death of Izz was not an accident, but a result of Aliff's intentional assault on the toddler. Additionally, Dr Gilbert Lau, senior consultant forensic pathologist, testified that based on his post-mortem examination result, Izz's cause of death was traumatic intracranial haemorrhage, or bleeding of the brain as a result of traumatic head injury, and he confirmed that the cause of these injuries was consistent with Aliff's first confession of pushing the baby instead of accidentally dropping him.

=== Conviction ===
On 13 July 2022, three months after a seven-day trial hearing in April, the trial judge Mavis Chionh Sze Chyi found Aliff guilty of murder and convicted him as charged under Section 300(c) of the Penal Code. Justice Chionh rejected Aliff's defence that Izz's injuries were due to an accidental fall, and instead, she accepted Dr Gilbert Lau's autopsy findings that Izz's injuries did not result from an accident, and that Aliff's first confession of pushing Izz's head against the van floorboard was more consistent with what Dr Lau identified as the cause of the baby's fatal injuries. Justice Chionh also stated that from his actions after the fatal assault, Aliff did not care about Izz's welfare but only cared about covering up his crime with the guilt of knowing that Izz died in his care and his fear of his involvement being discovered. Justice Chionh described Aliff's post-killing behaviour in her own words, "It was not the behaviour of someone who was anxious to get Izz's injuries treated after seeing Izz hurt himself in an accidental fall."

The trial judge also gave little weight to the "sketchy" character evidence of Aliff's sister, due to the fact that Aliff was a "glib and disingenuous witness" who repeatedly distorted the truth and gave numerous accounts behind Izz's death, and hence it was irrelevant to prove his credibility or absolve him of his culpability for killing the baby. Justice Chionh's acceptance of Izz's mother as a credible and truthful witness also shot down Aliff's "baseless" allegations that she gave evidence under police threats to incriminate him. Given that Aliff had intentionally cause hurt to Izz and these injuries were such that they were in the ordinary course of nature would result in death, Aliff's crime was sufficient to return with a guilty verdict of murder under the law.

After his conviction trial, Aliff's sentencing was scheduled to take place in August 2022.

=== Sentencing trial ===
In their final submissions during Aliff's sentencing trial, the prosecution expressed they would not seek the death penalty, and instead argued for Aliff to be sentenced to life imprisonment and to also receive caning between 15 and 18 strokes of the cane. The defence aligned themselves with the prosecution's arguments and similarly urged the court to sentence Aliff to life in prison, though however, the defence sought a lower caning sentence of five to six strokes of the cane.

On 11 August 2022, Justice Mavis Chionh, having heard the submissions from both sides, released her judgement and stated that based on the precedent case of Kho Jabing, the death penalty should be strictly imposed in cases of murder where an offender's conduct demonstrated viciousness and/or blatant disregard for human life despite lacking the intention to cause death. Justice Chionh found that in comparison to Kho's case and several others, Aliff's conduct, on the balance of probabilities, did not deserve the maximum punishment of death. She noted that Aliff did not premeditate or plan to commit the assault on Izz, he also did not make additional moves for the victim to suffer as much as possible, and he had done the assault in a fit of rage and frustration, and while his actions of slamming the baby's head against the van's floorboard was reprehensible, Aliff's level of viciousness was not severe enough to the extent of sparking an outrage of the community's feelings, and his extent of disregard for human life was not sufficiently high to call for the imposition of the death penalty. Due to this, the trial judge decided to spare Aliff the gallows and opted for the minimum sentence of life sought by both the prosecution and defence.

As for the issue of caning, Justice Chionh stated that compared to several cited murder cases of offenders receiving life and caning, the nature of Aliff's crime was in line with the severity of the more serious cases, as his victim was a defenceless child who was nine months of age, and there was a great physical disparity between Aliff and the baby: Izz was only 71 cm in height and weighed 7.3 kg at the time of his death, and in contrast, Aliff was a full-grown male adult, which highlighted the vulnerability of the victim and made the case more aggravating in nature. She also pointed out that Aliff had violated the trust of the boy's mother by inflicting violence on the child and demonstrated "a disturbing lack of remorse" for murdering the boy. Justice Chionh also stated that it is paramount to convey the courts' "clear message that no caregiver – whether a parent or any individual to whom the welfare of the child has been entrusted – has any licence to inflict violence with impunity on any young children in his or her charge". For this, the judge aligned her decision with the prosecution's arguments and rejected the defence's arguments for five to six strokes of the cane for it was manifestly inadequate in Aliff's case.

Hence, in accordance to Section 302(2) of the Penal Code, Justice Mavis Chionh sentenced 29-year-old Mohamed Aliff Mohamed Yusoff to life imprisonment and 15 strokes of the cane. Under Singapore law, like all other life term prisoners, Aliff was required to serve the minimum period of 20 years behind bars before he could be assessed for his eligibility of release on parole based on his conduct in prison. Aliff's sentence was backdated to 8 November 2019, the date of his arrest.

As the murder case had brought shock throughout the online community of Singapore, several members of the public felt that Aliff's sentence was too light, and they questioned the stance of Singapore regarding the death penalty, given that in the year 2022 itself, Singapore sent several drug traffickers to the gallows in many high-profile cases while sentencing murderers for life in prison rather than death.

== Appeal and imprisonment ==
After the end of his murder trial, Mohamed Aliff Mohamed Yusoff appealed against his conviction for murdering Izz Fayyaz Zayani Ahmad.

On 11 September 2023, more than a year after he was found guilty and sentenced, the Court of Appeal's three judges - Judges of Appeal Tay Yong Kwang, Belinda Ang and Steven Chong - dismissed Aliff's appeal and upheld his conviction after hearing it on the same day. Justice Tay, who pronounced the verdict in court, stated that in contrast to Aliff's claim that he was threatened by his interrogators during questioning, evidence showed that Aliff was not coerced by police investigators to change his story and that he admitted at the first instance about intentionally pushing Izz against the floorboard of his new van and causing the injuries on the baby, which in turn led to the death of the baby. Therefore, Aliff's claims of making his statements involuntarily were not accepted by the Court of Appeal.

In turn of rejecting Aliff's allegations against the police, the three appellate judges also rejected Aliff's story that Izz sustained the injuries from an accidental fall, which was also in contrast to the objective evidence presented during the trial. Therefore, they found no basis to overturn the trial judge Mavis Chionh's decision to reject Aliff's defence and convict him of murder. Before the court session, Aliff informed the appellate court that he decided to not appeal against his sentence of life imprisonment and 15 strokes of the cane, and as a result, the Court of Appeal affirmed both the life sentence and caning imposed in Aliff's case.

Since the end of his appeal process, Aliff is presently incarcerated at Changi Prison.

In the aftermath, according to 2025 news reports covering the 2020 killing of Megan Khung, the murder of Izz Fayyaz Zayani Ahmad was listed as one of at least eight most high-profile cases of child abuse resulting in death that happened in Singapore between 2015 and 2023.

== See also ==
- Kho Jabing
- Murder of Nonoi
- Murder of Huang Na
- 2016 Toa Payoh child abuse case
- Caning in Singapore
- Life imprisonment in Singapore
- Capital punishment in Singapore
- List of major crimes in Singapore
- List of cases affected by the Kho Jabing case
