= 2007 Singapore AWOL incident =

2007 case of a National Serviceman going AWOL in Singapore

- 2007 police mugshot of Dave Teo Ming, who deserted with a rifle and bullets
- Location: Singapore
- Date: 2 September 2007 – 3 September 2007
- Attack type: Desertion; Attempted use and illegal possession of firearms
- Deaths: 0
- Injuries: 0
- Victim: 0
- Perpetrators: Dave Teo Ming (20); Ong Boon Jun (21)
- Motive: Dave Teo Ming to murder his ex-girlfriend Ong Boon Jun; None
- Charges: Dave Teo Ming; Illegal possession of a firearm (x1); Illegal possession of ammunition (x1); Threatening a person with a knife (x1); Ong Boon Jun; Consorting a person who possessed a firearm (x1)
- Verdict: Dave Teo Ming; Teo pleaded guilty to one count of illegally possessing a rifle, one count of illegally possessing eight live rounds of ammunition and one count of threatening his ex-girlfriend with a knife Teo sentenced to nine years and two months' jail and 18 strokes of the cane Ong Boon Jun; Ong pleaded guilty to one count of consorting a person who possessed a firearm Ong sentenced to jail for 78 months and given six strokes of the cane
- Convictions: Dave Teo Ming; Illegal possession of a firearm (x1); Illegal possession of ammunition (x1); Threatening a person with a knife (x1); Ong Boon Jun; Consorting a person who possessed a firearm (x1)
- Convicted: Dave Teo Ming (20); Ong Boon Jun (21)
- Judge: Ong Boon Jun; Liew Thiam Leng; Dave Teo Ming; Tay Yong Kwang

On 2 September 2007, 20-year-old Corporal Dave Teo Ming (张铭 Zhāng Míng), a full-time National Serviceman from the Singapore Armed Forces (SAF), went absent without official leave (AWOL) from Mandai Hill Camp and deserted his unit with a SAR-21 assault rifle and eight live 5.56mm rounds. Teo was arrested at a shopping mall in Orchard Road after a 20-hour manhunt and he was charged with possessing a rifle and live rounds of ammunition under the Arms Offences Act. It was alleged that Teo escaped camp and intended to use the rifle to murder his ex-girlfriend and several other people he hated in his life. In July 2008, Teo was put on trial, convicted and sentenced to nine years and two months' jail and 18 strokes of the cane. During February of that same year, Teo's accomplice Ong Boon Jun (王文俊 Wáng Wénjùn) was also given a sentence of 78 months' jail with six strokes of the cane for consorting with Teo who illegally possessed a firearm.

== AWOL incident and manhunt ==
On 2 September 2007, 20-year-old Corporal Dave Teo Ming of the 1st Singapore Infantry Regiment of the Singapore Armed Forces went missing from Mandai Hill Camp. His disappearance was only noticed at 11.59 pm, and it was also discovered by the army personnel that Teo's rifle and five bullets, which were issued to him for guard duty, were also missing. As a result, the military police were alerted to Teo's desertion and they conducted a search within the camp premises. After the search failed to locate Teo, the Singapore Police Force took over the case and thus initiated an island-wide manhunt, and over 200 police officers participated in the manhunt to capture Teo, although this operation was conducted in secrecy and away from the public eye.

About 20 hours later, at about 8pm on 3 September 2007, Teo was finally arrested at a shopping mall near Orchard Road; the police discovered him at a toilet in the mall's third floor, just when Teo managed to load the rifle. The police managed to recover the rifle and five bullets; they also recovered three more live rounds of ammunition which Teo stole from the camp back in August 2007 during a live-firing exercise. A 40-cm long knife was also recovered in Teo's possession. Based on first-hand investigations, the police managed to uncover that while on the run, Teo and a friend had stayed at a Geylang hotel and asked for a Thai prostitute. The same friend was also arrested on suspicion of having accompanied and abetted Teo during his desertion. The police announced to the public regarding the incident, and they admitted that this manhunt was not publicized out of consideration for the operation to be carried out safely and successfully, and for fear that it may only provoke the suspect into resorting to worse measures. The Ministry of Defence (MINDEF) also stated in a media statement that MINDEF and the Singapore Armed Forces (SAF) would cooperate with the police in investigating the case.

In response to the arrest of Dave Teo, his 70-year-old grandmother Tan Ah Hoon, who was his primary caregiver after his parents' divorce, was in a state of anguish over her grandson's actions, especially since she already lost one of her grandsons (Teo's younger brother) to a car accident in 2001. Tan died from liver cancer in late 2007 while Teo was still in remand awaiting trial for the AWOL incident he perpetuated. The public was also shocked at the desertion, and it was also speculated that Teo had gone AWOL due to a failed relationship, although a source revealed that Teo, who was originally supposed to end his National Service (NS) in October 2007, had performed well in his NS duties. Teo's army partner and superior also noted that Teo did not show any unusual behaviour during his time at the army camp, although the superior recalled that Teo was stressed about issues related to his ex-girlfriend.

The AWOL case of Dave Teo was the first time in 23 years where a National Serviceman had gone AWOL with a rifle and ammunition. The last such case happened on 6 August 1984, when 18-year-old Teo Yong Kuan, who came from the 30th Singapore Combat Engineering Battalion, was charged with stealing an AR-15 rifle and 30 bullets from Khatib Camp. Teo Yong Kuan, who admitted to all charges, was sentenced to five years' imprisonment and 12 strokes of the cane on 12 May 1986.

== Criminal charges of Ong and Teo ==
On 5 September 2007, 20-year-old Dave Teo Ming was officially charged in the Subordinate Courts with an unlawful possession of a firearm under the Arms Offences Act. His 21-year-old accomplice Ong Boon Jun was also charged in the same court, and he faced one count of consorting with Teo while being aware that Teo possessed a firearm. Teo, who did not wish to plead guilty, faced a sentence of between five and 14 years' jail with the mandatory minimum of six strokes of the cane for the charge he faced in court. A week later, Teo faced two additional charges on top of the firearms charge he first received back in September; mainly one count of possessing bullets illegally and one count of using a knife to threaten his ex-girlfriend in an unrelated case.

Ong originally was offered a S$50,000 bail, but due to his family's poor financial situation, they were unable to raise the amount on short notice and Ong thus voluntarily gave up bail, and thereafter remained in remand. On the other hand, Teo was not offered bail as he still posed a great risk to public safety should he ever be freed, and the possibility of him contacting other witnesses was also among the factors considered in refusing Teo's request for bail.

In October 2007, Teo's case was transferred to the High Court for trial hearing on a later date. During a preliminary hearing on 27 November 2007, Teo's counsel sought a reduction of his charges, likely on the grounds of diminished responsibility, and the counsel was earlier given time until 21 December to submit psychiatric evidence to the court. Ong's counsel similarly asked the court to reduce their client's charges.

In January 2008, Ong's case was scheduled to be heard separately in the Subordinate Courts, while Teo's case would move forward for hearing in the High Court as approved in March 2008. On 14 February 2008, it was reported that Ong would plead guilty to the charges against him, and his defence lawyer Amolat Singh planned to argue for the minimum penalty of five years' jail in mitigation during the upcoming trial.

In April 2008, Teo was scheduled to stand trial on 7 July 2008 for the charges preferred against him in the AWOL incident, after the Subordinate Courts ruled in the preliminary hearing that a prima facie case had been established against Teo.

== Conviction and appeal of Ong Boon Jun ==
On 26 February 2008, Ong Boon Jun, then 22 years old, pleaded guilty at a district court to one count of consorting with Teo while having the knowledge that he possessed a firearm. Ong was sentenced to 6 1/2 years' imprisonment (or 78 months' imprisonment) and six strokes of the cane by District Judge Liew Thiam Leng, who stated that no compromise should be made to the safety of the public and the security of the nation, and as a former National Serviceman who knew well the need for safeguarding public safety, Ong had plenty of opportunities to report Teo to the police, especially with the knowledge that Teo wanted to commit firearm robbery. Ong's adoptive mother and father were allowed to speak to Ong after his sentencing, and Ong "inconsolably wept" as he apologized to his adoptive parents, and his adoptive mother consoled him, advising him to learn his lesson. On 1 March 2008, it was confirmed that Ong would appeal against his sentence.

During Ong's appeal hearing at the High Court, Amolat Singh argued on behalf of Ong that he was merely a reluctant accomplice who had been "shell-shocked" by the sight of Teo's rifle and he was afraid of his safety and did not want to unnecessarily excite Teo into doing something rash with the weapons. He also asked the jail term of Ong should be reduced on the grounds that it was manifestly excessive. In rebuttal, the prosecution argued that Ong had ample opportunity to dissociate himself from Teo but he did not, and there was nothing to support Ong's claims of fear as he chose to stay in the same hotel as Teo for four hours with the rifle being close to him prior to Teo's arrest.

In the end, Ong's appeal was dismissed by Justice V. K. Rajah on 20 May 2008. Justice Rajah stated that while it was understandable for Ong to not report to the police but he did wrong all the same and the law should be equal to anyone, including Ong. Justice Rajah stated that by having the knowledge that Teo planned to use the rifle for a crime and yet not taking steps to alert the authorities, Ong's culpability in this case was heightened and he should be punished, in order to send a signal that anyone who chose to do nothing would face the full force of the law.

== Background of Dave Teo Ming ==
Dave Teo Ming
- Born: Dave Teo Ming; 1 August 1987 (age 39); Singapore
- Occupation: Full-time National Serviceman (former)
- Status: Released since 2017
- Allegiance: Singapore
- Motive: Going AWOL in order to kill his ex-girlfriend and others
- Convictions: Illegal possession of a firearm (one count); Illegal possession of ammunition (one count); Threatening a person with a knife (one count)
- Criminal charges: Illegal possession of a firearm (one count); Illegal possession of ammunition (one count); Threatening a person with a knife (one count)
- Penalty: Nine years and two months' imprisonment and 18 strokes of the cane

Born in August 1987, Dave Teo Ming was likely the second of four children in his family, and he had one younger brother, one older brother and one younger sister. According to news sources and court documents, Teo had an unhappy childhood and he came from a dysfunctional family background. Teo's father often went to prison for various offences, and as of the time when Teo was arrested for desertion, Teo's father was incarcerated for drug trafficking. Teo's mother heavily gambled and neglected her two sons, relentlessly and cruelly abusing Teo and his younger brother, often beating them up whenever she lost money, and she even did so for no reason on numerous occasions. Teo's mother would also throw chairs at him constantly. According to Teo, he told his psychiatrist that his mother would repeatedly cane him until the cane broke and serious bruises were left on his back. Teo's grandparents and aunt stated that the trauma of abuse had affected him gravely.

Eventually, Teo's parents divorced when he was merely seven, and his mother abandoned the Teo brothers and took Teo's younger sister, Teo Ping, away. Therefore, Teo and his brother lived with their paternal grandparents, but he was abused by his uncle. When Teo was 14, his younger brother Teo Zhong Yi, died in a car accident 2 days before his twelfth birthday in 2001, and Teo was extremely devastated over his brother's death, as he and his brother shared a close relationship. The death of his brother was a great blow to Teo, causing a downward spiral in his life and disciplinary problems. He also began to isolate himself from his family, felt depressed, and was often filled with anger and hate towards people around him. Teo often played truant, and he eventually dropped out during his third year of secondary school.

At age 16, Teo fell in love with his schoolmate Crystal Liew, who was 14 at the time she first met Teo. The couple's romantic relationship however, slowly became fraught with conflicts and difficulties due to Teo being "highly possessive" and was often jealous of his girlfriend whenever she went out with her friends. Teo would also call her and demand that she go home immediately, and he was also sometimes abusive towards her, both verbally and physically. The relationship continued even after Teo enlisted in National Service in September 2005, but in early 2007, Teo posted for a short stint to Taiwan for his national service, and the couple often argued with each other. Eventually, in April 2007, the couple broke up, and this caused Teo to become devastated, withdrawn and irritable. As a result, after his return to Singapore, Teo often stalked his ex-girlfriend, hanging out at her condominium and outside her school, hoping she would change her mind, and he even went AWOL just to see her. On one occasion, Teo took a knife along and used it to threaten his ex-girlfriend should she refuse to continue their relationship. Even if his ex-girlfriend rejected him, Teo would spend the night at the stairwell of her condominium and never left the area. He was eventually caught and sent to the detention barracks, but Teo was undeterred and eventually hatched a plan to kill his ex-girlfriend out of spite for her abandoning him. As a result, he escaped the army base and spent 20 hours on the run before he was caught.

According to a psychiatric report issued by Dr Kenneth Koh of the Institute of Mental Health, Teo was suffering from severe depression, as a result of the particularly traumatic experiences of child abuse and negative feelings he suffered from the break-up. The symptoms of Teo's depression also include his alcoholism, his gradual behaviour of not caring about his appearance (he had a liking of wearing branded clothes regularly) and his "self-destructive" acts of non-stop exercising until he was exhausted and not drinking any water. In fact, Teo had given multiple stories about why he wanted to steal the rifle; although the general consensus of Teo's motive was that he wanted to murder his ex-girlfriend, one of these other versions, which Teo told his accomplice Ong Boon Jun, was that he would use it to commit robbery, and another version to his senior officer, Lieutenant Choo Yong Sheng, over the phone was that he hated five people and wanted to shoot them dead. Teo even told his psychiatrist that he never wanted to use the rifle to harm his ex-girlfriend but just to threaten her to reconcile with him. At another point, Teo even claimed he wanted to turn the gun on himself after pumping "the first bullet" on his ex-girlfriend.

== Trial and sentencing ==
On 7 July 2008, ten months after his arrest, 20-year-old Dave Teo Ming was officially stood trial at the High Court for a total of three charges, consisting of one count of illegally possessing a rifle, one count of illegally possessing eight live rounds of ammunition and one count of threatening his ex-girlfriend with a knife in a separate case. Teo pleaded guilty to all three counts, and he was accordingly convicted of all charges by Justice Tay Yong Kwang of the High Court.

During Teo's sentencing hearing, the trial court was told about the Teo's background, as well as the turn of events and circumstances leading up to the AWOL incident. Deputy Public Prosecutor (DPP) Peter Koy argued that a deterrent punishment was warranted in Teo's case due to his actions of deserting the army and wanting to go after his ex-girlfriend and other perceived enemies with the rifle, and he also stated it was fortunate that nothing disastrous happened due to the timely intervention from the authorities. DPP Koy also argued that any acts of "flagrant abuse of life-threatening weapons and ammunition cannot be condoned", and Teo had grossly violated his duty of safeguarding the public as a soldier and posed a great threat to the public, and he thoroughly violated the Oath of Allegiance instead of adhering to it. On the side of the defence, Teo's lawyer K. Mathialahan argued that the court should exercise leniency on Teo, who was a victim of child abuse and came from a dysfunctional family, and he suffered the loss of his brother and grandmother in his life, and he asked the court to send Teo off to reformative training in view of Teo's age and mental condition.

After receiving the submissions, Justice Tay Yong Kwang delivered his verdict, sentencing 20-year-old Dave Teo Ming to a total of nine years and two months' imprisonment and 18 strokes of the cane, stating that Teo committed a very grave offence by stealing a rifle and bullets and escaped his army camp with an intention to act on his dark-hearted agenda, "especially so in this age of increased security concerns everywhere". During his oral sentencing remarks, Justice Tay expressed sympathy for Teo's tragic life, telling that his heart was "hurt" for Teo. In his own words, Justice Tay advised Teo:

'My heart hurts for you that so young a man will have to spend some of the best years of his life in prison and have to undergo so many strokes of the cane, but I trust that you understand a deterrent sentence is unavoidable in the circumstances.

Dave (Teo), you have had a very hard life. I hope that this unfortunate and traumatic wrong turn in your life will make you much more mature and a whole lot wiser and that you will spend the next few years reconstructing your young life.

I hope that you will pursue your studies, listen to good advice from counsellors and learn many skills while in prison and that, upon your release, you will have a life full of meaning and purpose to honour the memory of your grandmother and your beloved younger brother.

It has been written, 'To everything there is a season'. There was a time when you loved, there came a time when you hated. There was a time when you felt you wanted to kill, now is the time for you to heal. There was a time you were broken down, now is the time to build yourself up. There was a time when you were at war in your being, now is the time to restore peace within.'

Teo reportedly nodded at the judge's words of encouragement, with his head bowed and sadness reflected in his eyes. None of Teo's family members were present in court, although his mother showed up in the courtroom briefly before the sentence was passed. An opinion piece praised Justice Tay for upholding the need for deterrence while at the same time, expressing sympathy and compassion towards Teo in a moving judgement of his case, which was rarely observed in Singapore's strict justice system.

Teo was released since 2017 after completing his jail term.

== Aftermath ==
In the aftermath of the incident, the case of Dave Teo gained massive attention from the public and several politicians in Singapore, who all called for thorough investigations and questioned why did this incident happened. The Ministry of Defence (MINDEF) decided to review their current systems and procedures to detect any lapses and ensure that similar crimes did not ever happen in the future, and adopt more stringent measures to ensure the strict control of firearms and ammunition. Additionally, the MINDEF reiterated that any misuse of firearms "can lead to very serious consequences". Similarly, the authorities also reinforced the security of army bases and camps and their screening of personnel to prevent similar cases from happening. A parliament inquiry was also conducted to investigate how Teo bypassed the regulations and was able to go AWOL with the rifle and ammunition. An inquiry from the Singapore Armed Forces (SAF) found that negligence on the part of several National Servicemen was what contributed to the security lapses that led to Teo making off the base with the stolen rifle.

Soon after the conviction of Teo, his ex-girlfriend agreed to be interviewed and she gave her side of the story. Teo's ex-girlfriend, who had since started afresh with a woman she fell in love with, stated that the possessiveness and jealousy of Teo in their four-year relationship was one main reason why they broke up. After the sentencing of Teo, Thomas Koshy, a non-practicing lawyer, wrote an opinion piece in a newspaper with regards to the case. The attention of his contributed article was focused on Ong Boon Jun, rather than the main perpetrator Dave Teo. Koshy expressed his concern that Ong was convicted under Section 7 of the Arms Offences Act for being an accessory of Teo who had in his possession a firearm, and he stated that Section 7 was "so broadly worded", that it might implicate those who were not culpable of any criminal enterprise initiated by the main offender aside from merely being in the company of the offender, and it was the case that Ong, who indeed accompanied Teo, never had any part behind Teo's plans to use the rifle to commit whichever possible crimes within his calculation. Koshy stated that the charge against Ong might be unduly harsh and inappropriate, and it would have been more accurate and appropriate to charge and convict Ong of a lesser offence of failing to report a crime to the police, which was more relevant considering the situation Ong was in.

In 2017, the case of Dave Teo Ming was brought up once again when Third Sergeant Jared Mok Shi Jie was found guilty by a court martial of having illegally brought ten bullets out of his army base, and sentenced to 16 weeks in detention. The MINDEF reiterated through the case that they had a rigorous system for the "issuance, use and recovery" of ammunition, and any offenders would not be spared from the law for acts of stealing ammunition.

A 2021 article from The Smart Local named the case of Dave Teo as one of the nine most terrible crimes that brought shock to Singapore in the 2000s.

== See also ==
- Arms Offences Act
- Caning in Singapore
- List of major crimes in Singapore
