= Gopal Baratham =

Singaporean author and neurosurgeon

- Born: 9 September 1935
- Died: 23 April 2002 (aged 66); Singapore
- Education: University of Malaya; Royal London Hospital Medical College
- Known for: Author
- Relatives: Baratham Ramaswamy Sreenivasan (Father)
- Medical career
- Profession: Doctor
- Institutions: Department of Neurosurgery, University of Edinburgh; Tan Tock Seng Hospital; Private practice
- Sub-specialties: Neurosurgeon
- Research: Neurosurgery
- Awards: 1991: Southeast Asia Write Award

Gopal Baratham (9 September 1935 – 23 April 2002) was a Singaporean author and neurosurgeon. He was known for his frank style and his ability to write about topics that were often considered controversial in the conservative city-state.

== Life ==
Born to a physician (Baratham's father was Dr B.R. Sreenivasan, Vice-Chancellor of the University of Singapore, 1962-63) and a nurse, Baratham decided to follow his parents and entered the medical profession. However, his youth was marked by the experience of the Japanese occupation. In 1954 he registered at the Medical College of the University of Malaya, Singapore, and, after studying at the Royal London Hospital in 1965, he entered the Department of Neurosurgery at the University of Edinburgh in 1969. He finished his studies by 1972, when he was already 36 years old, to become a surgeon at the Thomson Road General Hospital in Singapore. He headed the Neurosurgery Department at the Tan Tock Seng Hospital between 1984 and 1987, and went into private practice after relinquishing his post as department head. He retired full-time from medical practice in 1999.

Baratham died of pneumonia on 23 April 2002, aged 66. Baratham had been in hospital for about a month for pneumonia and heart problems. He had had open-heart surgery in 1989.

=== Writing career ===
Baratham began his passion for writing in the 1960s, and never stopped writing throughout his medical career. His first novel, Fuel in Vacant Lots, was however never finished. In 1974 he was able to get his first short story, "Island", published in Commentary, the publication of the National University of Singapore Society.

It was only in 1981 that his first book collection of short stories entitled Figments of Experience was published.

In 1991, Dr. Baratham published his most successful novel, A Candle or the Sun, which he had started working on in 1983. The novel was published in London and not in Singapore due to its controversial nature. The novel was loosely based on Operation Spectrum, the case of the so-called Marxist conspiracy, a group of Catholic activists whom the Singapore government had declared to be Communists and subsequently arrested. The same year he also published an erotic love-story called Sayang set in Singapore, Malaysia, and Indonesia. He won the S.E.A. Write Award and was elected the president of the ASEAN Association of Neurosurgeons.

In 1994, Dr. Baratham wrote an account of the events surrounding the sentencing to caning of the American teenager Michael Fay, called The Caning of Michael Fay.

In 2014, Baratham was the focus of the Singapore Writers Festival Literary Pioneer Showcase. "A Tribute to Gopal Baratham" comprised a dramatised reading of excerpts from Baratham's short stories by the Big Bad Wolf theatre company, a forum discussing Baratham's literary legacy featuring poet Kirpal Singh, editor Mindy Pang and writer Crispin Rodrigues, and a short film adaptation of Baratham's short story "'Homecoming'" by director Wee Li Lin.

In 2015, The Straits Times Akshita Nanda selected A Candle or the Sun as one of 10 classic Singapore novels. She called it "brilliant" and "funny".

== Awards ==
- National Book Development Council of Singapore (NBDCS) Highly Commended Book Award – Figments of Experience (1982)
- National Book Development Council of Singapore (NBDCS) Commended Book Award – People Make You Cry and Other Stories (1990)
- S.E.A. Write Award (1991)

== Literary works ==
=== Short story collections ===
- Figments of Experience (1981, Times Books International) ISBN 9971650940
- People Make You Cry and Other Stories (1988, Times Books International) ISBN 9971655063
- Love Letter and Other Stories (1988, Times Books International) ISBN 9971655098
- Memories that Glow in the Dark (1995, PipalTree Pub.) ISBN 9810062060
- The City of Forgetting: The Collected Stories of Gopal Baratham (2001, Times Books International) ISBN 9812321438
- Collected Short Stories (2014, Marshall Cavendish) ISBN 9789814351140

=== Novels ===
- A Candle or The Sun (1991, Serpent's Tail; 1992, Penguin; 2014, Marshall Cavendish) ISBN 1852422254 ISBN 0140148175 ISBN 9789814351355
- Sayang (1991, Times Books International; 2014, Marshall Cavendish) ISBN 9812042911 ISBN 9789814328609
- Moonrise, Sunset (1996, Serpent's Tail; 2014, Marshall Cavendish) ISBN 1852425016 ISBN 9789814351362

=== Non-Fiction ===
- The Caning of Michael Fay (1994, KRP Publications) ISBN 9810057474

=== Secondary Texts ===
- Of Memory and Desire: The stories of Gopal Baratham by Ban Kah Choon (2000, Times Books International) ISBN 9812320830

=== Anthologies ===
- Gwee Li Sui, ed. Written Country: The History of Singapore through Literature (2016, Landmark Publications) ISBN 9789814189668

=== Unfinished Work ===
- Fuel in Vacant Lots (1977)
- Beads in a Sutra
