= Caning in Singapore =

Corporal punishment

Caning is a widely used form of corporal punishment in Singapore. It can be divided into several contexts: judicial, prison, reformatory, military, school, and domestic. These practices of caning as punishment were introduced during the period of British colonial rule in Singapore. Similar forms of corporal punishment are also used in some other former British colonies, including two of Singapore's neighbouring countries: Malaysia and Brunei.

Of these, judicial caning is the most severe. It is applicable to only adult male convicts under the age of 50 for a wide range of offences under the Criminal Procedure Code, up to a maximum of 24 strokes per trial. Always ordered in addition to a prison sentence, it is inflicted by specially trained prison staff using a long and thick rattan cane on the prisoner's buttocks in an enclosed area in the prison. Male criminals who were not sentenced to caning earlier in a court of law may also be punished by caning in the same way if they commit aggravated offences while serving time in prison. Similarly, male juvenile delinquents in reformatories may be punished by caning for serious offences.

Servicemen in the Singapore Armed Forces (SAF) who commit serious military offences may be sentenced by a military court to a less severe form of caning in the SAF Detention Barracks, which houses military offenders.

In a much milder form, caning is used as a disciplinary measure in schools. Boys aged between 6 and 19 may be given up to three strokes with a light rattan cane on the buttocks over clothing or the palm of the hand as a punishment for serious misconduct, often as a last resort. As the law does not allow schools to cane girls, they receive alternative forms of punishment such as detention or suspension.

A smaller cane or other implement is often used by some parents to punish their children. This practice is allowed in Singapore but not encouraged by the government. The Singaporean government has stated that in its opinion, the Convention on the Rights of the Child does not prohibit "the judicious application of corporal punishment in the best interest of the child."

== Judicial caning ==
=== History ===
Caning, as a form of legally sanctioned corporal punishment for convicted criminals, was first introduced to Malaya and Singapore during the period of British colonial rule in the 19th century. It was formally codified under the Straits Settlements Penal Code Ordinance IV in 1871.

In that era, offences punishable by caning were similar to those punishable by birching or flogging (with the cat o' nine tails) in England and Wales. They included robbery, aggravated forms of theft, burglary, assault with the intention of sexual abuse, a second or subsequent conviction of rape, a second or subsequent offence relating to prostitution, and living on or trading in prostitution.

Caning remained on the statute book after Malaysia became independent from Britain in 1957, and after Singapore ceased to be part of Malaysia in 1965. Subsequent legislation has been passed by the Parliament of Singapore over the years to increase the minimum strokes an offender receives, and the number of crimes that may be punished with caning.

=== Legal basis ===
Sections 325–332 of the Criminal Procedure Code 2010 lay down the procedures governing caning. They include the following:

- A male offender, under 50 years of age, who has been certified to be in a fit state of health by a medical officer is liable to be caned.
- The offender shall receive no more than 24 strokes of the cane on any one occasion, irrespective of the total number of offences committed. In other words, a man cannot be sentenced to more than 24 strokes of the cane in a single trial, but he may receive more than 24 strokes if the sentences are given out in separate trials. However, in the first case where a prisoner received more than 24 strokes in a single trial, armed robber Qwek Kee Chong (who served ten years in prison) was given 48 strokes of the cane on 8 April 1988 and later hospitalised for his injuries from the caning; he was later granted compensation for this error.
- If the offender is under 18, he may receive up to 10 strokes, but with a lighter cane. Boys under 16 may be sentenced to caning only by the High Court and not by the State Courts.
- Offenders sentenced to death whose sentences have not been commuted shall not be caned.
- The rattan cane used shall not exceed 1.27 cm (0.50 inches) in diameter.
- Caning must not be carried out in instalments. This is to ensure that prisoners receive their punishment in a single session and do not have to go through the process repeatedly, even if the full sentence might not have been administered for medical reasons.

Any male convict, whether sentenced to caning or not, may also be caned in prison if he commits certain offences while serving time in prison.

Singapore has not signed or ratified a number of international human rights treaties which prohibit the use of corporal punishment. These include the International Covenant on Civil and Political Rights, the Convention Against Torture and the International Convention for the Protection of All Persons from Enforced Disappearance.

==== Exemptions ====
Under the law, women, men above the age of 50, and men sentenced to death, whose sentences have not been commuted, cannot be sentenced to caning.

It was not uncommon for the courts to extend, by up to 12 months, the prison terms of offenders originally sentenced to caning but later found to be medically unfit to undergo the punishment. However, on 9 May 2017, the High Court ruled that the courts should not automatically impose an additional jail term in lieu of caning unless there are reasons to do so. According to judicial indicative guidelines, in situations where the court has to extend a convict's prison term in lieu of caning, the extension will range from nine to 12 months when the case involves more than 19 strokes of the cane.

=== Offences punishable by caning ===
Singaporean law allows caning to be ordered for over 35 offences, including hostage-taking/kidnapping, robbery, gang robbery with murder, rioting, scams, causing grievous hurt, drug abuse, vandalism, extortion, voyeurism, sexual abuse, molestation (outrage of modesty), and unlawful possession of weapons. Caning is also a mandatory punishment for certain offences such as rape, drug trafficking, illegal moneylending, and for foreigners who overstay by more than 90 days – a measure designed to deter illegal immigrants.

While most of Singapore's laws on offences punishable by caning were inherited from the British legal system through the Indian Penal Code, the Vandalism Act was only introduced in 1966 after independence, in what has been argued by Jothie Rajah to be an attempt by the ruling People's Action Party (PAP) to suppress the opposition's activities in the 1960s because opposition supporters vandalised public property with anti-PAP graffiti. Vandalism was originally prohibited by the Minor Offences Act, which made it punishable by a fine of up to S$50 or a week in jail, but did not permit caning. Today, the Vandalism Act imposes a mandatory caning sentence of between three and eight strokes for a conviction of vandalism. Caning is not imposed on first-time offenders who use delible substances (e.g. pencil, crayon, chalk) to commit vandalism.

Beginning in the 1990s, the higher courts have been more inclined to impose caning sentences in cases where caning is a discretionary punishment. For example, in 1993, an 18-year-old molester was initially sentenced to six months' imprisonment but he appealed against his sentence. Chief Justice Yong Pung How not only dismissed his appeal, but also added three strokes of the cane to the sentence. This precedent set by the Chief Justice became a benchmark for sentences in molestation cases, where the court is expected to sentence a molester to at least nine months' imprisonment and three strokes of the cane if the offence involves touching the victim's private parts.

In some cases, male employees can be sentenced to caning for offences committed by the company they work for. For instance, the Dangerous Fireworks Act states that caning is mandatory for a manager or owner of a company which imports, delivers or sells dangerous fireworks. Another example is the transporting of illegal immigrants; a manager of a company who authorises or participates in such activity can be sentenced to caning. In July 1998, police reported six cases of employers sentenced to imprisonment and caning for hiring illegal immigrants.

The importation of chewing gum is subject only to fines; it is not and has never been an offence punishable by caning.

=== Statistics ===
In 1993, the number of caning sentences ordered by the courts was 3,244.

By 2007, this figure had doubled to 6,404, of which about 95% were actually implemented. Since 2007, the number of caning sentences has experienced an overall decline, falling to 1,257 in 2016.

Caning takes place at several institutions around Singapore, most notably Changi Prison, and including the now defunct Queenstown Remand Centre, where Michael Fay was caned in 1994. Canings are also administered in Drug Rehabilitation Centres.

Year	Number of sentences	Sentences carried out	Notes
1993	3,244		
2006	5,984	95%	
2007	6,406	95%	
2008	4,078	98.7%	January to September only
2009	4,228	99.8%	January to November only
2010	3,170	98.7%	
2011	2,318	98.9%	
2012	2,500	88.1%	
2014	1,430	86%	January to September only
2015	1,382	81.7%	January to October only
2016	1,257	78.5%	January to October only

Most caning sentences are far below the legal limit of 24 strokes. Although sentences of between three and six strokes are much more common, they usually receive less or no coverage by the media. Normally, only the more serious cases involving heavier sentences will have a greater tendency to be reported in the press.

=== Caning officers ===
The prison officers who administer caning are carefully selected and specially trained for the job. They are generally physically fit and strongly built. Some hold high grades in martial arts even though proficiency in martial arts is not a requirement for the job. They are trained to use their entire body weight as the power behind every stroke instead of using only the strength from their arms, as well as to induce as much pain as possible. They can swing the cane at a speed of up to 160 km/h (99 miles per hour) and produce a force upon impact of at least 880 N.

=== The cane ===
A rattan cane, no more than 12.7 mm (0.5 inches) in diameter and about 1.2 m (3.9 feet) in length, is used for judicial and prison canings. It is about twice as thick as the canes used in the school and military contexts. The cane is soaked in water overnight to make it supple and prevent it from splitting and embedding splinters in the wounds. The Prisons Department denies that the cane is soaked in brine, but has said that it is treated with antiseptic before use to prevent infection. A lighter cane is used for juvenile offenders.

=== Administration procedure ===
Caning is, in practice, always ordered in addition to a jail sentence, and not as a punishment by itself. Those who are sentenced to caning and are in the process of appealing against their sentences do not have their sentences carried out while pending the outcome of their appeals. Similarly, during the period before the convicts' deadlines of their appeal notices, caning is not carried out until the deadline expires and with the convict not making a notice of appeal.

It is administered in an enclosed area in the prison out of the view of the public and other inmates. However, anecdotal evidence suggests that the offender, while waiting in a queue for his turn to be caned, has the chance to observe or hear the screams and cries of those before him getting caned. The order is determined by the number of strokes the offender is receiving, with the largest number going first. A medical officer and the Superintendent of Prisons are required to be present at every caning session.

The offender is not told in advance when he will be caned; he is notified only on the day his sentence is to be carried out. Offenders often undergo a lot of psychological distress as a result of being put into such uncertainty. On the day itself, the medical officer examines him by measuring his blood pressure and other physical conditions to check whether he is medically fit for the caning. If he is certified fit, he proceeds to receive his punishment; if he is certified unfit, he is sent back to the court for the sentence to be remitted or converted to additional time in prison. A prison officer confirms with him the number of strokes he has been sentenced to.

In practice, the offender is required to strip completely naked for the caning. Once he has removed his clothes, he is restrained in a large wooden trestle based on the British dual-purpose prison flogging frame. He stands barefooted on the trestle base and bends over a padded horizontal crossbar on one side of the trestle, with the crossbar adjusted to around his waist level. His feet are tied to a lower crossbar on the same side by restraining ankle cuffs made of leather, while his hands are secured to another horizontal crossbar on the other side by wrist cuffs of similar design; his hands can hold on to the crossbar. After he is secured to the trestle in a bent-over position at an angle of close to 90° at the hip, protective padding is tied around his lower back to protect the vulnerable kidney and lower spine area from any strokes that might land off-target. The punishment is administered on his bare buttocks to minimise the risk of any injury to bones and organs. He is not gagged.

The caning officer positions himself beside the trestle. The Director of Prisons explained in a 1974 press conference, "Correct positioning is critically important. If he is too near the prisoner, the tip of the cane will fall beyond the buttocks and the force of the stroke will cause the unsupported tip to dip and bend the cane and thus reduce the effect of the stroke. If he is too far, the stroke will only cover part of the buttocks." Strokes are delivered at intervals of about 30 seconds. The caning officer is required to exert as much strength as he can muster for each stroke. The offender receives all the strokes in a single caning session, not in instalments. According to anecdotal evidence, if the sentence involves a large number of strokes, two or more officers will take turns to cane the offender every six strokes to ensure that the later strokes are as forceful as the earlier ones.

During the caning, if the medical officer certifies that the offender is not in a fit state of health to undergo the rest of the punishment, the caning must be stopped. The offender will then be sent back to the court for the remaining number of strokes to be remitted or converted to a prison term of no more than 12 months, in addition to the original prison term he was sentenced to.

=== Effects ===
Caning can cause significant physical damage, depending largely on the number of strokes inflicted. Michael Fay, who received four strokes, said in an interview, "The skin did rip open, there was some blood. I mean, let's not exaggerate, and let's not say a few drops or that the blood was gushing out. It was in between the two. It's like a bloody nose."

A report by the Singapore Bar Association stated, "The blows are applied with the full force of the jailer's arm. When the rattan hits the bare buttocks, the skin disintegrates, leaving a white line and then a flow of blood."

Usually, the buttocks will be covered with blood after three strokes. More profuse bleeding may occur in the case of a larger number of strokes. An eyewitness described that after 24 strokes, the buttocks will be a "bloody mess".

Men who were caned have variously described the pain they experienced as "unbearable", "excruciating", "equivalent to getting hit by a lorry", "having a hot iron placed on your buttocks", etc. A recipient of 10 strokes said, "The pain was beyond description. If there is a word stronger than excruciating, that should be the word to describe it".

Most offenders struggle violently after each of the first three strokes and then their struggles lessen as they become weaker. By the time the caning is over, those who receive more than three strokes will be in a state of shock. During the caning, some offenders will pretend to faint but they have not been able to fool the medical officer, who decides whether the punishment continues or stops. Offenders often undergo a lot of psychological distress before and during the caning: They are not only afraid of the physical pain, but are also worried whether they can prevent themselves from crying out because crying means that they would "lose face" and be labelled "weak" by their fellow inmates.

Gopal Baratham, a Singaporean neurosurgeon and opponent of the practice, in his book The Caning of Michael Fay: The Inside Story by a Singaporean, criticised the American tabloid press for false claims, such as that canings are public events (in fact they always take place privately inside the prison):

Two lashers took turns to wield the bamboo cane. Blood spurted, bits of flesh flew and the prisoner screamed in pain. ... The canings drew hundreds of people, including a lot of women and everybody seemed to love it. Each time the guy got wacked [sic], the crowd would roar – like at a hockey game. They really enjoyed what they saw. (New York Newsday, 20 April 1994)

=== Recovery ===
After the caning, the offender is released from the trestle and receives medical treatment. Antiseptic lotion (gentian violet) is applied on the wounds. The offender is also given painkillers and antibiotics.

The wounds usually take between a week and a month to heal, depending on the number of strokes received. During this time, offenders cannot sit down or lie down on their backs, and experience difficulties controlling their bowels. Bleeding from the buttocks may still occur in the days after the caning. Madasamy Ravi, a human rights lawyer, described the injuries of his client, Ye Ming Yuen, who received 24 strokes, as follows:

All over his buttocks were multiple marks and deep lacerations. It was so shocking [that] my female paralegal who was with me almost fainted. [...] The wounds were so deep with blood, flesh and layers of the skin exposed. He didn't have any bandages, just a towel to put over the buttocks. He couldn't sit for too long so he was standing up.

Permanent scars remain after the wounds have healed.

=== Notable cases ===
==== Foreigners ====
- Beh Meng Chai
- Nyu Kok Meng
- Soosay Sinnappen
- Michael P. Fay
- Ng Theng Shuang
- Kraisak Sakha
- Khwan-On Natthaphon
- Ng Chek Siong, one of the three suspects behind the murder of Lee Kok Cheong
- Galing Kujat
- Oliver Fricker
- Yong Vui Kong
- Cheong Chun Yin
- Wang Wenfeng
- Tony Anak Imba, Hairee Anak Landak and Donny Anak Meluda
- Yap Weng Wah
- Gobi Avedian
- David James Roach
- Dominic Martin Fernandez
- Ahmad Muin Yaacob
- Mogan Valo

==== Singaporeans ====
- Harun bin Ripin
- Bala Kuppusamy
- Two of three Singaporean men charged with the murder of Lee Juay Heng
- Kuppiah Saravanan
- Eight members of the Ang Soon Tong
- Zainal Abidin Abdul Malik
- Sashi Kumar Pubalasingam, who beat and raped a 69-year-old widow and sexually assaulted two students.
- Chua Gin Boon
- Three of the four youths who were charged with the murder of a 48-year-old taxi driver Jaswant Singh
- One of the two men charged with murdering lorry driver Yeu Lam Ching
- A welder and one of the two murderers responsible for the 1985 contract murder of Nurdin Nguan Song
- Roshdi Abdullah Altway
- Two men convicted for the Oriental Hotel murder
- The seven gang members charged with the murder of Png Hock Seng
- Saminathan Subramaniam
- Mohammad Zam Abdul Rashid
- Ng Hua Chye
- The eight gang members of Salakau, who were the perpetrators of a gang attack at South Bridge Road
- Peh Thian Hui
- Robson Tay Teik Chai
- Chua Ser Lien and Tan Ping Koon
- Chong Keng Chye
- Lim Poh Lye and Tony Koh Zhan Quan
- The three perpetrators of the murder of Jagagevan Jayaram
- Dave Teo Ming and Ong Boon Jun
- Four of the five main perpetrators behind the murder of a lorry driver Wan Cheon Kem
- Madhuri Jaya Chandra Reddy
- A gang leader responsible for the death of Darren Ng Wei Jie
- Gunasegaran Ramasamy
- Azuar Ahamad
- A supermarket sales executive charged with kidnapping Ng Lye Poh
- Three of the five people involved in the St James Power Station murder
- Two accomplices of logistics mover and suspected fugitive Mohamed Taufik Zahar
- Loh Suan Lit
- Jackson Lim Hou Peng
- Zaini Jamari, convicted of abusing Mohamad Daniel Mohamad Nasser
- Muhammad Iskandar bin Sa'at
- Syed Maffi Hasan
- Three of the seven suspects involved in the 2019 Orchard Towers murder
- Ridzuan Mega Abdul Rahman
- Pua Hak Chuan
- Muhammad Salihin Ismail
- Mohamed Aliff Mohamed Yusoff
- Surajsrikan Diwakar Mani Tripathi
- Mohamad Fazli Selamat
- A man convicted in the Ayeesha child abuse case
- Heng Boon Chai
- Wong Shi Xiang, convicted of the 2020 abuse and killing of Megan Khung

=== Comparison of judicial caning in Brunei, Malaysia and Singapore ===
Judicial caning is also used as a form of legal punishment for criminal offences in two of Singapore's neighbouring countries, Brunei and Malaysia. There are some differences across the three countries.

	Brunei	Malaysia	Singapore
Sharia caning	In practice		Not in practice
Juveniles	Local courts may order the caning of boys below the age of 16. Juveniles are punished "in the way of school discipline" with their clothes on.		Only the High Court may order the caning of boys below the age of 16.
Age limit	Men above the age of 50 cannot be sentenced to caning.	Men above the age of 50 cannot be sentenced to caning. However, the law was amended in 2006 such that men convicted of sex offences may still be sentenced to caning even if they are above the age of 50. In 2008, a 56-year-old man was sentenced to 57 years jail and 12 strokes of the cane for rape.	Men above the age of 50 cannot be sentenced to caning.
Maximum no. of strokes per trial	24 strokes for adults; 18 strokes for juveniles	24 strokes for adults; 10 strokes for juveniles	
Terminology	The official term is whipping in accordance with traditional British legislative terminology.	The official term is whipping in accordance with traditional British legislative terminology. Informally, the term caning, as well as strokes of the cane and strokes of the rotan, is used.	In both legislation and press reports, the term used is caning.
Dimensions of the cane	About 1.2 m (3.9 ft) long and no more than 1.27 cm (0.5 in) in diameter	About 1.09 m (3.6 ft) long and no more than 1.25 cm (0.49 in) in diameter	About 1.2 m (3.9 ft) long and no more than 1.27 cm (0.5 in) in diameter
Type of cane	The same type of rattan cane is used on all offenders regardless of the offence committed.	Two types of rattan canes are used: The smaller one is for white-collar offenders while the larger one is for other offenders.	The same type of rattan cane is used on all offenders regardless of the offence committed.
Modus operandi	The offender is tied to a wooden frame in a bent-over position with his feet together. He has protective padding secured around his lower back to protect the kidney and lower spine area from strokes that land off-target.	The offender stands upright at an A-shaped wooden frame with his feet apart and hands tied above his head. He has a special protective "shield" tied around his lower body to cover the lower back and upper thighs while leaving the buttocks exposed.	The offender is tied to the trestle in a bent-over position with his feet together. He has protective padding secured around his lower back to protect the kidney and lower spine area from strokes that land off-target.

== Prison caning ==
Male convicts who are not sentenced to caning by the courts may be caned if they commit aggravated or serious offences in prison while serving their sentences. This type of caning is carried out in the same way as judicial caning ordered by the courts.

A prison superintendent may order an inmate to receive up to 12 strokes of the cane for aggravated offences that have serious implications for institutional order and discipline. Such offences include engaging in gang activities, mutiny, attempting to escape, destruction of prison property, and assaulting prison staff or fellow inmates. Upon receiving a report of an offence, the prison provost officers will conduct an investigation to collect and review evidence. After that, the accused inmate is given an opportunity to hear the charge and evidence against him and present his defence before a superintendent. The case will also be reviewed by an independent committee appointed by the Ministry of Home Affairs (MHA), comprising reputable members of the public and including at least one legally-trained member. After that, the Commissioner of Prisons will review the case and confirm the punishment imposed or vary it accordingly. Depending on the circumstances, the case may be referred to a visiting justice, who has the authority to order an inmate to be caned.

In 2021, the MHA revealed that from 2011 to 2020, the Singapore Prison Service administered 2,875 instances of prison caning to 2,149 inmates for committing aggravated or major offences in prison. The median number of strokes was three and the most common offences involved aggravated violence against other inmates and violence against prison staff. No cases were referred to visiting justices during that period.

== Military caning ==
In the Singapore Armed Forces (SAF), a subordinate military court, or the officer in charge of the SAF Detention Barracks, may sentence a serviceman to a maximum of 24 strokes of the cane for committing certain military offences or for committing aggravated offences while being detained in the Detention Barracks. In all cases, the caning sentence must be approved by the Armed Forces Council before it can be administered. The minimum age for a serviceman to be sentenced to caning is 16 (now 16 1/2 de facto, since entry into the SAF is restricted to those above that age). This form of caning was originally intended primarily for use on recalcitrant teenage conscripts serving full-time National Service in the SAF.

Military caning is less severe than its civilian counterpart, and is designed not to cause undue bleeding or to leave permanent scars. The offender must be certified by a medical officer to be in a fit condition of health to undergo the punishment and shall wear "protective clothing" as prescribed. The punishment is administered on the buttocks, which are covered by a "protective guard" to prevent cuts. The cane used is no more than 6.35 mm (0.25 inches) in diameter (about half the thickness of the prison/judicial cane). During the punishment, the offender is secured in a bent-over position to a trestle similar to the one used for judicial/prison canings.

== Reformatory caning ==
Caning is used as a form of legal corporal punishment in government homes, remand homes and other homes for youths.

Youths aged 16 and below who have allegedly committed crimes may be placed in remand homes during the period of investigation. If convicted, they may be sent to the state-run reformatories, namely the Singapore Boys' Home and the Singapore Girls' Home, for up to three years. The Singapore Boys' Home has youths aged 11 through 18 who have been sent there by the courts for committing offences such as theft, robbery or rioting, or because they have been deemed to be Beyond Parental Control.

Youths whose parents have applied for Beyond Parental Control orders against them are placed in remand homes during the period of investigation. They may thereafter be placed in homes which also house juvenile offenders.

The superintendents of reformatories are allowed to impose corporal punishment, in the form of caning, on only male residents as a last resort for serious misconduct. They are required to maintain a record of the details and evidence of the offender's misconduct and their reasons for using corporal punishment as a last resort. Persons with mental or physical disability are exempted from such punishment. Solitary confinement is also permitted for children of and above 12 years of age, except in remand homes.

Caning is administered in private by the superintendent in the presence of a staff member, or by a staff member authorised by the superintendent in the presence of another staff member. A maximum of ten strokes may be inflicted on either the palm of the hand or the buttocks over clothing.

In the Singapore Boys' Home, boys are routinely caned on the buttocks for serious offences such as fighting, bullying and absconding. A 2006 article in The Straits Times reported that there were two cases of bullying per month on average; one youth also said that he had been caned over 60 times in three years at the Singapore Boys' Home. A former Singapore Boys' Home resident who received 10 strokes for absconding when he was 18 said that his buttocks took two weeks to heal sufficiently before he could sit down properly.

In the Singapore Girls' Home, punishments for serious offences may include solitary confinement in a windowless room. Previously, caning on the palm of the hand was allowed for female residents and had been carried out before. However, the Children and Young Persons (Government Homes) Regulations 2011 now clearly prohibits corporal punishment for female residents.

Apart from the Singapore Boys' Home and Singapore Girls' Home, there are other juvenile institutions managed by voluntary welfare organisations, such as the Boys Town operated by the Montfort Brothers of St. Gabriel for boys of ages 11 to 21. Although these juvenile institutions are legally allowed to administer corporal punishment on male offenders in the same way as the state-run reformatories, they must obtain the management committee's authorisation before carrying it out.

== School caning ==
Caning is a legal disciplinary measure in primary and secondary schools, junior colleges and centralised institutes. Under Section 88 of the Education (Schools) Regulations, it is permitted for male students only.

The Ministry of Education (MOE) states that corporal punishment is allowed for serious or repeated misconduct under the Education (Schools) Regulations, and adds that counselling and follow-up guidance should be carried out. At most schools, caning comes after detention but before suspension in the hierarchy of penalties. Some schools implement a demerit points system, in which students receive mandatory caning after accumulating a certain number of demerit points for a wide range of misconduct. The possibility of caning as a corrective action is often explicitly stated in schools' student handbooks or on their websites. As of 2018, 13% of primary schools and 53% of secondary schools (excluding all-girls schools) communicated on their websites that caning may be administered to male students for serious misconduct.

Canings in school may be sorted into these categories:

- Private caning: The most common form of school caning. The offending student is caned in the school's General Office in the presence of the Principal and/or Vice-Principal, together with another witness (usually the student's Form Teacher or Co-Form Teacher). His parents or guardians may be invited to the school to witness the punishment being meted out.
- Class caning: The offending student is caned in front of his class to serve as a warning for his classmates.
- Public caning: The offending student is caned in front of an assembly of the entire school population to serve as a warning for potential offenders. This form of punishment is normally reserved for very serious offences and repeated offences. Certain offences that warrant a public caning include smoking, vaping, alcohol consumption, drug- or gang-related activities, fighting, causing hurt to others, vandalism, arson, extortion, theft and any case involving the Police.
- Others: There may be intermediate levels between a "class caning" and a "public caning", such as in front of all classes in the same year as the student.

Under MOE regulations, the punishment may be administered only by the Principal or any staff member under the Principal's express authority, usually the Vice Principal, Discipline Master, Operations Manager, or any other specially delegated member of the school's Disciplinary Committee. The offending student's parents or guardians must then be informed of the details at the earliest possible time once the punishment has been imposed. Some schools may seek parental or guardian consent before administering the punishment. A maximum of three strokes may be inflicted at a time, using a light rattan cane. The limit was previously six strokes before MOE reduced it to three strokes in 2017. The student may be caned only on either the palm of the hand or the buttocks over clothing. Although boys of any age from six to 19 may be caned, most recipients of such punishments are secondary school students aged 14 to 16 inclusive. A solemn and formal ceremony, school caning is typically carried out in a manner similar to the caning punishments administered in England before school corporal punishment was banned there in 1998. Some schools tuck a protective item (e.g. book, file, rolled-up newspaper, piece of cardboard) into the student's waistband to protect his lower back in case a stroke lands off-target. The student then places his hands on a desk or chair, bends over or leans forward, and receives strokes from the rattan cane on the seat of his trousers or shorts.

Certain schools adopt special practices. For example, following English traditions, some schools (mainly all-boys schools) require the student to change into physical education (PE) attire for the punishment because PE shorts are apparently thinner than normal uniform trousers/shorts, even though the main purpose is probably to enhance the formality of the occasion. In some schools, if the caning is conducted in public, the student is required to make a public apology before or after receiving his punishment. Although caning on the palm of the hand is rarely implemented, one notable exception is Saint Andrew's Secondary School, where students may be caned on the hand for committing less serious offences while a caning on the buttocks is reserved for more serious offences.

Based on first-hand accounts, the student typically feels moderate to acute pain for the first few minutes, depending on the number of strokes. This soon leads to a stinging sensation and general soreness around the points of impact, usually lasting for some hours; sitting down is likely to be uncomfortable. Superficial bruises and weals may appear on the buttocks and last for a few days after the punishment.

=== Female students ===
As the Ministry of Education does not allow any form of corporal punishment to be administered to female students, they receive alternative forms of punishment such as detention, Corrective Work Orders, in-house suspension, counselling or suspension.

In 2004, Ng Lee Huat, the principal of Nan Chiau High School, controversially stepped down after admitting to hitting a 14-year-old female student with a soft-cover book.

== Domestic caning ==
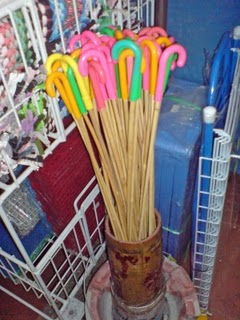
Canes sold in grocery stores, used by parents to discipline children at home

Caning is also imposed on children by their parents as punishment for offences like poor/imperfect results, disrespect, disobedience, incomplete work, lying, and trying to escape caning. The misbehaving child is usually caned on the buttocks or palm of the hand. Sometimes, the cane will miss and hit the bare thighs/calves, causing more pain. The caning usually leaves the child with painful red welts that will fade within days.

The most commonly used implement is a thin and light rattan cane, commonly and cheaply found (for around 50 Singapore cents) in neighbourhood provision shops. There is usually higher demand when students prepare for examinations, as the cane is used more often during this time, resulting in breakages. Sometimes, parents will use other implements such as the rattan handle of a feather-duster, bamboo poles, rulers, clothes hangers, or even their bare hands.

In Singapore, not caning children is seen as being soft on them, and not instilling proper discipline. According to a survey conducted by The Sunday Times in January 2009, 57 percent of surveyed parents expressed the view that caning was an acceptable form of punishment, and that they had used it on their children for reasons such as stubbornness, refusal to listen and dangerous/harmful acts. A newer study conducted by YouGov in 2019 found that nearly 80 percent of parents in Singapore had carried/carries out corporal punishment at home.

Parental caning is legal in Singapore, but not particularly encouraged by the authorities. Under the Children and Young Persons Act, ill-treatment of a child or young person is defined as inflicting any unnecessary physical pain, suffering or injury, any emotional harm, or any injury to a child's health or development. The person who has the custody, charge or care of the child or young person subjected to ill-treatment may be punished by a fine of up to S$8,000 or imprisonment of up to eight years, or both. Several factors are usually considered when determining if parental corporal punishment becomes a criminal offence: the proportionality of the punishment to the offence, the child's age, as well as the frequency of the punishment. The Ministry of Social and Family Development's Child Protective Service will also investigate and intervene where there are serious child protection concerns, such as when parental discipline results in serious physical injury or emotional trauma to a child.

== Politicians' opinions on caning in Singapore ==
=== Judicial caning ===
Judicial caning is purportedly meant to serve as a humiliating experience for offenders and as a strong deterrent to crime. In 1966, when Singapore's first Prime Minister, Lee Kuan Yew, introduced caning as a mandatory punishment for vandalism, he said in Parliament, "[...] if (the offender) knows he is going to get three of the best, I think he will lose a great deal of enthusiasm, because there is little glory attached to the rather humiliating experience of having to be caned."

In a 2004 interview with China Central Television, Lee explained why caning should continue in Singapore with reference to the 1994 Michael Fay incident: "Every country has its own problems to face, we know, certain things. You put a person in a prison, it makes no difference. He will not change. Because you observe certain rules, there's enough food, enough exercise, fresh air, sunshine ... But if you cane him, and he knows he will be given six of the best on his buttocks, and it will hurt for one week that he can't sit down comfortably, he will think again."

Although the extensive use of judicial caning is a policy commonly associated with the ruling People's Action Party (PAP), the opposition parties do not oppose it because they agree on its effectiveness as a deterrent to crime. Politicians from the opposition parties have voiced support for corporal punishment. Edmund Ng, a candidate for the Singapore Democratic Alliance in the 2006 general election, said, "For criminals, caning serves as a deterrent [...] I would not change a winning formula." Sylvia Lim, a Member of Parliament from the Workers' Party, also said in 2007, "What are the purposes of jail, fine and caning? Caning is controversial internationally, but if one must justify why we cane offenders, it is just deserts for pain which the offender has caused to the victim, for example, hurt, injury or the threat of violence. Caning is a severe punishment, and it is always combined with jail as the offences tend to be serious and to make it easier, administratively, to arrange for the caning to take place."

The severity and humiliation of the punishment are widely publicised in various ways, mainly through the press but also through other means such as the education system. For example, juvenile delinquents get to watch a real-life demonstration of caning on a dummy during compulsory prison visits.

Singapore has come under strong international criticism for its practice of judicial caning, especially after the 1994 Michael Fay incident. Amnesty International condemned the practice of judicial caning in Singapore as a "cruel, inhuman or degrading punishment". It is also regarded by some international observers as a violation of Article 1 in the United Nations Convention against Torture. However, Singapore is not signatory to the Convention. Human Rights Watch similarly referred to the practice of caning as "an inherently cruel punishment".

The Singaporean government has defended its stance on judicial caning and said that the punishment does not amount to torture and is conducted under strict standards and medical supervision. While most Singaporeans either support or are indifferent towards the practice of judicial caning, there is a minority – including dissident Gopalan Nair, lawyer M Ravi and businessman Ho Kwon Ping – who are completely or partially opposed to it.

A recipient of nine strokes thinks that even though it may be a nightmare the first time, an offender who has been caned before will have experienced the extent of fear of criminal punishment and so may not find it as much of a disincentive to commit repeat offences. He said, "After he knows what it's like, he will have nothing left to fear. He will know what to expect no matter how many strokes he gets – it's more of the same. No alcohol and women – apart from those two things, prison is really not that bad."

In 2022, President Halimah Yacob expressed the need to review the age limit for caning in the case of sex offenders, in light of several high-profile rape cases (especially those involving fathers raping their daughters), where most of the offenders aged 50 and above who escaped caning despite being harshly sentenced to lengthy periods of incarceration by the courts, including a 55-year-old cleaner who was jailed for 33 years after getting convicted of raping his three daughters over a 14-year period, a 54-year-old tutor and paedophile who was sentenced to 45 years' jail for the rape of eight children (including those with learning difficulties) and a fifty-year old man who got 23 years' jail for raping his eleven-year-old daughter over three months due to a Fengshui master's advice. While some expressed concerns over the deterrence effect of caning towards rapists aged more than fifty, most lawyers also supported the need for a review of the age limit for caning in relation to serious crimes like rape, as they felt that the suitability to cane should be decided based on health rather than age, and it may pave way to greater consistency behind sentencing. Among them, Criminal lawyer Johannes Hadi called the age limit of 50 "an arbitrary line in the sand", and questioned the exemption of females from caning based on sexist ideas about the physical difference between men and women. Another lawyer, Law Society of Singapore president Adrian Tan, commented about the need to cane rapists regardless of their age, "If you're fit enough to rape, you should be fit enough to be caned." Criminal lawyer Sunil Sudheesan also stated that there should also be measures to ensure a 50-year-old prisoner's suitability to cane based on his health to avoid any sudden health issues from arising during the caning process.

=== School caning ===
Critics, such as the United Nations, argue that since Singapore is signatory to the Convention on the Rights of the Child, it is obliged to "take all appropriate legislative, administrative, social and educational measures to protect the child from all forms of physical or mental violence, injury or abuse". However, the Singaporean government stated that it considers "the judicious application of corporal punishment in the best interest of the child."

As Singapore evolves, some citizens may perceive that schools are refraining from using corporal punishment due to their fears of a strong backlash from parents. Educators, when interviewed, say that they are cognisant of Singapore's changing landscape, both in terms of the family structure as well as the influence of social media, in the reduction of corporal punishment in schools. They note that understanding and accepting such punishment is essential to the effectiveness of caning as a deterrent to misconduct. According to a Singaporean legal advice website, as long as schools administer corporal punishment according to MOE guidelines, parents may not take legal action against the school as they are not direct employers of the school.

== In arts and media ==
=== Media ===
- Prison Me? No Way!, a 15-minute video commissioned by Singapore's National Crime Prevention Council to deter teenagers from crime. The video, released in 1998 and filmed in Changi Prison and Changi Reformative Training Centre, shows life in prison from the perspectives of two young offenders and includes a reenactment of a judicial caning.
- The Homecoming, a 2007 Singaporean television series produced by MediaCorp. In the drama, four men were convicted of arson in their youth and sentenced to imprisonment and three strokes of caning each. One of them received one more stroke, supposedly for being the mastermind. The caning scene is featured briefly in flashbacks.
- Ilo Ilo, a 2013 Singaporean family film directed by Anthony Chen. In one scene, the main character Jiale (Koh Jia Ler) receives a public caning in school for fighting with his classmate in the washroom.
- Rotan, a 2017 Singaporean short film shown at the Singapore International Film Festival 2017 and directed by Hamzah Fansuri. The film is about a father, who is also the discipline master at his son's school, having to uphold his own principles and punish his rebellious son for breaking the school rules.

=== Literature ===
- The Caning of Michael Fay: The Inside Story by a Singaporean (1994), a documentary book by Gopal Baratham published in the wake of the controversial caning of Michael P. Fay. It concentrates on the personal aspects, the punishment and the sociology of caning in Singapore. The book includes some descriptions of caning and photographs of its results, as well as two personal interviews with men who had been caned before.
- The Flogging of Singapore: The Michael Fay Affair (1994) by Asad Latif.

== See also ==
- Caning
- Caning in Brunei
- Caning in Malaysia
- Corporal punishment in Taiwan
- Judicial corporal punishment
- School corporal punishment
