= 2016 Standard Chartered bank robbery =

2016 bank robbery in Singapore

- Date: 7 July 2016; 10 years ago
- Location: Standard Chartered branch, Holland Village, Singapore
- Participants: David James Roach

The 2016 Standard Chartered bank robbery was a bank robbery that took place in Singapore on 7 July 2016. Bank robberies are rare in Singapore: the last successful robbery occurred in 2004. A total of S$30,045 was stolen, and the perpetrator, David James Roach, a Canadian national, fled Singapore on the same day to Bangkok, Thailand. Roach was subsequently jailed in Thailand on money-laundering charges, before being deported back to Canada in 2018.

During the deportation process, he was arrested at Heathrow Airport in London by British authorities and was then extradited to Singapore in 2020 for bank robbery and removing criminal proceeds from Singapore. The extradition carried a promise to the British government not to mete out corporal punishment on Roach when found guilty. Roach was sentenced to five years' jail and six strokes of the cane on 7 July 2021. The caning was subsequently remitted through the exercise of the President's clemency powers, thus fulfilling the promise to the British government.

== Perpetrator ==
David James Roach, a Canadian born in Cape Breton Island, Nova Scotia, had been backpacking since 2015 before arriving in Singapore on 29 June 2016. He was aged 26 then. Roach had studied engineering in Calgary.

== Robbery ==
=== Planning phase ===
After arriving in Singapore, Roach planned to rob a bank from 5 July onwards. He made several reconnaissance trips to the targeted bank, a Standard Chartered bank branch at Holland Village, Singapore, and its surrounding environment. He had also bought new clothes, among them a sweater, to be used during the robbery, and disposed of immediately thereafter. The day before he committed the robbery, Roach stayed in three different hostels in Chinatown.

=== Robbery ===
On the morning of 7 July 2016, Roach entered the bank. He approached a pregnant bank teller with a note which read, "This is a robbery, I have a weapon, give me money, don't call the police." Believing that he had a weapon, the teller handed Roach a sum of S$30,450. Roach then fled the scene on foot. The police, upon receiving an alert from the bank, combed the area for a Caucasian suspect, but he was nowhere to be found.

=== Escape ===
Roach changed out of his clothes upon exiting from the bank, and boarded a taxi several minutes later. The taxi brought him back to his hostel where he collected his personal belongings and left for Changi Airport. He bought an AirAsia ticket to Bangkok and left Singapore at 2:40 p.m. on the same day.

== Aftermath ==
=== Roach's arrest and imprisonment in Thailand ===
Roach was caught on 9 July 2016 in his hostel in Bangkok, after Singapore authorities had alerted their Thai counterparts. As Singapore had issued a warrant of arrest for Roach, Thailand cancelled his rights to stay in the country, and detained him for seven days in an immigration detention centre. The Singapore authorities asked for Roach to be repatriated back to Singapore, but the request fell through as Singapore and Thailand had no treaty to allow such extraditions. At the same time, Canadian authorities wanted to extradite Roach back to Canada, given that Thailand and Canada had an existing extradition treaty. Instead, Thai authorities decided to charge and sentence Roach for violating currency regulations and money laundering. Roach, who had failed to declare that he possessed more than US$20,000 in assets upon arriving in Thailand, was initially sentenced to 2 years and 4 months of jail, but it was halved to 14 months after he confessed to the money-laundering charges. The money, S$30,450 (2016) (US$22,041.26), was seized by Thailand as well.

=== Extradition from United Kingdom ===
Upon release from Thai prison, Roach was deported back to Canada and was placed on a multi-legged flight. While on a stopover at Heathrow Airport, London, he was arrested by British authorities on 11 January 2018 as Singapore had an active arrest warrant on him. Singapore requested for him to be extradited, which Roach challenged. A UK judge ruled on 29 August 2018 that the extradition request could be fulfilled under UK laws. This came after Singapore gave assurances that Roach would not be caned if sentenced in Singapore. In October 2018, the British foreign secretary Jeremy Hunt approved the extradition. Roach further appealed against the judgement, but failed to secure a favourable outcome in February 2020. Roach was extradited to Singapore on 16 March 2020.

=== Charging and sentencing of Roach ===
On 17 March 2020, Roach was charged with robbing a bank and removing criminal proceeds out of Singapore. Roach was assessed by two psychiatrists to have major depressive disorder, and it was a "contributory factor" in committing the robbery. On 7 July 2021 he was sentenced to five years' prison and six strokes of the cane, after pleading guilty to the two charges. The prison sentence was backdated to when he was first remanded in March 2020. No restitution was made by Roach. President of Singapore Halimah Yacob granted Roach clemency and remitted his caning sentence, thus fulfilling the promise made to the British government; no alternative punishment was given to Roach in lieu of caning.

== See also ==
- List of major crimes in Singapore
- Caning in Singapore
