= Murder of Lee Juay Heng =

1987 murder of a cake shop proprietor in Singapore

- Lee Juay Heng, who died from a fatal knife wound to his neck
- Location: Hougang, Singapore
- Date: 14 February 1987
- Attack type: Murder
- Weapon: Knife
- Deaths: 1
- Injuries: 0
- Victim: Lee Juay Heng (47)
- Perpetrators: Tan Joo Cheng (34); Ong Ah Lek (32); Luah Kang Hai (32)
- Motive: Robbery
- Charges: Murder
- Verdict: Ong and Luah found guilty of attempted armed robbery in 1989 and 1990 respectively Tan found guilty of murder and sentenced to death in 1990; Ong and Luah each jailed for six years and caned 18 strokes
- Convictions: Tan Joo Cheng; Murder; Ong Ah Lek; Attempted armed robbery Luah Kang Hai; Attempted armed robbery
- Convicted: Tan Joo Cheng (34); Ong Ah Lek (32); Luah Kang Hai (32)
- Judge: Chao Hick Tin; L P Thean

On 14 February 1987, 47-year-old cake shop proprietor Lee Juay Heng (李锐兴 Lǐ Ruìxīng) was stabbed to death by three men during a robbery bid in Hougang, Singapore. The three robbers - Luah Kang Hai (赖江海 Lài Jiānghǎi), Tan Joo Cheng (陈裕清 Chén Yùqīng) and Ong Ah Lek (王亚厉 Wáng Yàlì) - were all arrested and charged with murdering Lee during the robbery. The court proceedings in the case concluded with both Ong and Luah convicted of lesser charges of attempted armed robbery and imprisoned with caning, while Tan himself was sentenced to death in 1990 for stabbing Lee to death in spite of his claim of intending to rob but not to kill Lee.

== Murder ==
On 14 February 1987, a cake shop proprietor was found murdered outside his second-storey flat at Hougang.

Lee Juay Heng, aged 47 and a father of four, died from a stab wound to his throat. It was reported that Lee was possibly attacked while unlocking the entrance to his flat, and while he was bleeding profusely, Lee tried to use his home telephone to call for help but as the telephone was out of order, and he thus staggered to the public telephone booth on the ground floor, where he was found collapsed beside the phone booth. Lee's wife, who was at home at the time and witnessed her husband being mortally wounded, reported the matter to the police, and she told the investigators that she never knew why her husband, reportedly a well-known character of the neighbourhood who had no enemies, was attacked. Friends described Lee as an easygoing person who was often polite towards people around him.

Lee's death was classified as murder, and the police were unable to determine the motive of the killing at first hand. A police spokesperson, Assistant Superintendent of Police Chan Choo Giap told the media that the murder weapon was believed to be a knife, but the murder weapon was not located as of the time when the media conference was held.

== Arrest of suspects ==
On 26 February 1987, two weeks after the murder of Lee Juay Heng, an unemployed 34-year-old inmate from a drug rehabilitation centre at Sembawang was arrested for the murder case, after the police received an informant's tip-off regarding two possible suspects behind the crime, and two men were arrested; the 34-year-old inmate was found to be involved while the other was not responsible for the crime and was released thereafter. The following day after the inmate's arrest, his 32-year-old accomplice (also jobless) was also caught in a police raid, and the police also initiated further investigations to trace the whereabouts of a missing third accomplice.

On 28 February 1987, the first two suspects, 34-year-old Tan Joo Cheng and 32-year-old Ong Ah Lek, were charged with murder, and they were subsequently held in remand to undergo further investigations and await trial.

The third accomplice was eventually identified as a Singaporean citizen named Luah Kang Hai (alias Ah Tee), and subsequently, on 15 March 1987, he was placed on the police's wanted list as a suspect of the robbery-murder. 32-year-old Luah was eventually arrested on 27 March 1987, and he was charged in court a day later with the murder of Lee Juay Heng, hence becoming the third and final suspect to be indicted for the case.

== Trial proceedings ==
=== Murder trial hearing ===
Defendants of the Lee Juay Heng murder trial
Tan Joo Cheng, the first accused who directly stabbed Lee to death

Ong Ah Lek, the second accused who masterminded the robbery that led to Lee's death

Luah Kang Hai, the third accused who purportedly acted as a lookout

On 12 April 1989, the three perpetrators - Ong Ah Lek, Tan Joo Cheng and Luah Kang Hai - claimed trial to a single charge of murdering Lee Juay Heng back in 1987. The trial was presided over by both Justice L P Thean (Thean Lip Ping) and Judicial Commissioner Chao Hick Tin of the High Court.

The case of the prosecution, led by Ismail Hamid, adduced the statements of the trio to portray the second accused Ong as the mastermind of the murder. Ong was said to have suggested to a friend that they should be robbing Lee, since he owned an expensive branded car and had a lot of cash in his possession. However, the friend Kho Yak Meng did not agree to join the robbery and had no interest in committing the crime. Even so, Kho, who worked as a hawker, introduced the first accused Tan to Ong, and Tan would join Ong into committing the robbery. Afterwards, Tan would rope in the third accused Luah Kang Hai to join them in robbing Lee. It was also the prosecution's contention that Tan was responsible for stabbing Lee to death, and they referred to a statement of Tan where he mentioned stabbing Lee during a fierce struggle and only learned of Lee's death through the local Chinese newspaper Lianhe Wanbao. During the course of trial, the trio denied murdering Lee, especially Tan who claimed he never had the intent to cause Lee to die from the stabbing.

At one point, the trial was delayed due to one of the defence lawyers needing to attend his father's funeral, after the lawyer's father died while his son was representing Ong in his defence.

=== Sentencing of Ong Ah Lek ===
Halfway throughout the trial, the prosecution decided to no longer prosecute one of the defendants, Ong Ah Lek, for murder and thus amended his murder charge to a lesser offence of attempted armed robbery. With the murder charge against him dropped, Ong no longer faced the death penalty for murdering Lee Juay Heng, which left both Luah Kang Hai and Tan Joo Cheng to remain facing trial for murder.

On 20 April 1989, Ong was allowed to plead guilty, and was sentenced to jail for six years and given 18 strokes of the cane. Both Judicial Commissioner Chao and Justice Thean agreed that there was no direct evidence proving Ong's involvement or culpability behind Lee's death, but Justice Thean, who passed sentence on Ong, stated that the court should not take a lenient view on the murder of Lee which resulted from Ong's planning of the robbery, and hence imposed a six-year jail term with caning (18 strokes) on Ong. The sentence was backdated to February 1987.

=== Defence of Tan Joo Cheng and Luah Kang Hai ===
After the reduction of Ong's murder charge, both Luah Kang Hai and Tan Joo Cheng continued to stand trial for the murder of Lee Juay Heng, and the two judges ruled on the same date of Ong's sentencing that both Tan and Luah had a case to answer and called for both the remaining accused to give their defence.

More than a year later, the trial resumed on 6 July 1990. Tan, who was said to have surrendered himself in order to not continue his detention in a drug rehabilitation centre, stated in his defence that after the trio began their plan to rob, he tailed Lee all the way to his flat, and he planned all along to use the knife to threaten Lee rather than causing him any harm to begin with. Tan stated that he and Lee got into a struggle when Lee was unlocking the door, and during the struggle itself, Lee accidentally lost his balance and the knife thus plunged into Lee's neck while he slipped and fell. Overall, Tan's contention was that he never meant to kill Lee, whose death he only found out through the local Chinese newspaper Lianhe Wanbao.

As for Luah, his defence was that he only acted as a look-out and he never took part in either the stabbing or the restraining of the victim. Afterwards, the judgement was reserved on 11 July 1990 and scheduled to be delivered on a later date.

=== Verdict ===
On 21 August 1990, both Judicial Commissioner Chao Hick Tin and Justice L P Thean delivered their final verdict, with Justice Thean pronouncing the decision in court.

In the judgement, Justice Thean found that Tan's defence of accidental stabbing was ought to be rejected, given that it was unbelievable to accept that Lee was stabbed due to him inadvertently falling forward into the knife held in Tan's hand, and there was no factual basis to support Tan's contention. The judges felt that it was more likely that Tan had deliberately knifed Lee on the neck and caused the single stab wound that was sufficient in the ordinary course of nature to cause death, and hence his actions warranted a guilty verdict of murder. On the other hand, the trial court determined that Luah was not present at the murder scene when the fatal stabbing took place, and did not participate in the struggle between Lee and Tan, and Luah was thus not held culpable for killing Lee as compared to Tan.

In conclusion, 37-year-old Tan Joo Cheng was found guilty of murdering Lee Juay Heng and sentenced to death by hanging, while 36-year-old Luah Kang Hai was acquitted of murder and therefore spared the death sentence. Instead, Luah was found guilty of a lesser charge of attempted armed robbery and sentenced to six years' imprisonment and 18 strokes of the cane, and Luah's jail term was backdated to the date of his arrest in March 1987.

== Aftermath ==
On 12 February 1992, the Court of Appeal heard Tan Joo Cheng's appeal, and dismissed it thereafter. The three judges - Chief Justice Yong Pung How, Justice S. Rajendran and Justice Goh Joon Seng - agreed that there was sufficient evidence to prove that Tan had the intention to stab Lee Juay Heng during the robbery bid, such that the injury caused was sufficient in the ordinary course of nature to cause death, and it was neither accidental nor unintentional. In the verdict, Justice Rajendran cited that, "Even if an accused intended to inflict only a relatively minor injury, if the injury that he in fact inflicted pursuant to that intention was an injury sufficient in the ordinary course of nature to cause death, the provisions of cl(c) of s 300 would be attracted." On these grounds, the appellate court unanimously dismissed Tan's appeal, and further condemning him to hang for the crime.

Since then, Tan Joo Cheng was hanged in Changi Prison on an unknown date for murdering Lee Juay Heng.

In the aftermath, the judgement of Tan's appeal was known to be one of the iconic cases that scrutinized the definition of murder under Section 300(c) of the Penal Code, which defines an act of murder as one of intentionally inflicting a fatal injury on the victim(s), and it also highlighted the difficulties and implications of convicting an offender of murder under this section, especially if the said offender did not have the intent to cause death or the bodily injury that resulted in death.

Also, a law journal also covered the case in July 1992, where it concerned the application of Section 34 of the Penal Code, which laid out the doctrine of common intention, where several people involved in a crime was liable to be held responsible for any acts done by one of the co-accused in the case. The author, K. L. Koh, stated that the facts of the case made it more likely that Tan's accomplices Luah Kang Hai and Ong Ah Lek should be held accountable for murder by their common intention of committing armed robbery, since Ong masterminded the crime and instructed both Luah and Tan to initiate the hold-up, and Luah himself was aware of the knife carried by Tan and expected the knife to be used during the commission of robbery, and both men's actions were indirectly connected to the outcome of Tan stabbing Lee to death.

== See also ==
- Capital punishment in Singapore
