= Murder of Png Hock Seng =

1997 gang-related killing of a National Serviceman in Singapore

Png Hock Seng
- Png Hock Seng, the 18-year-old victim
- Born: Png Hock Seng c. 1979; Singapore
- Died: 25 October 1997 (aged 18); Singapore General Hospital, Singapore
- Cause of death: Fatal stab wound from the back
- Other name: Phng Hock Seng
- Occupation: Full-time National Serviceman
- Known for: Murder victim

On 25 October 1997, near Dhoby Ghaut MRT station, 18-year-old Png Hock Seng (Chinese: 方福成; pinyin: Fāng Fúchéng; Pe̍h-ōe-jī: Png Hok-sêng; (Note: His Chinese name was also spelt as Chinese: 彭福成; pinyin: Péng Fúchéng; Pe̍h-ōe-jī: Phêng Hok-sêng) also spelt Phng Hock Seng), a full-time National Serviceman and member of the Sio Gi Ho gang, was attacked by seven members of the Sio Koon Tong gang, which operated at Orchard Road. Png died from a stab wound inflicted on his back. The seven offenders, all youths between 16 and 19, were charged with murdering Png, whom they erroneously believed to be a member of a rival gang.

The charges of murder against all seven accused were eventually reduced and the youths were thus convicted of lesser charges; out of all the seven, the main offender Allan Tan Kei Loon (Chinese: 陈凯伦; pinyin: Chén Kǎilún; Pe̍h-ōe-jī: Tân Khái-lûn) (Note: Some sources spelt his name as Allen Tan Kei Loon) was found guilty of the most serious charge of manslaughter, and sentenced to seven years' jail and nine strokes of the cane, despite the prosecution's request for the maximum sentence of life imprisonment and 24 strokes of the cane. Although the prosecution's appeal to raise Tan's sentence from seven years to life had failed, Tan's sentence was nonetheless increased to ten years' jail and 15 strokes of the cane. The remaining six offenders were convicted of rioting and jailed between 18 and 30 months with caning.

== Death at Dhoby Ghaut MRT station ==
On the night of 25 October 1997, an 18-year-old full-time National Service man was stabbed to death by a group of youths outside Dhoby Ghaut MRT station.

The victim was identified as 18-year-old Png Hock Seng, a Singaporean citizen who resided in Yishun with his parents and elder sister, and he only enlisted for two months at the time of his death. The police responded to a report about an alleged fight taking place at the nearby area, and they arrived to find Png, who was stabbed once on the back and also suffered multiple bruises and injuries on his body. Png was later pronounced dead on the way to Singapore General Hospital and his family never got there on time to see him one last time. An autopsy report by Dr Gilbert Lau revealed that single stab wound on Png's back measured about 20 to 22 cm deep and it penetrated the liver and kidney and the left chest, and it also severed the blood vessels, and the injury was sufficient in the ordinary course of nature to cause death.

According to his sister and parents, Png was a filial and obedient son and brother who had a close relationship with his family. Png's sister said that due to the family's poor financial situation, her brother wanted to sign on as an army regular in the Singapore Armed Forces (SAF) and earn money to allow his 20-year-old sister, a polytechnic student, to further her studies overseas, and the last time she saw her brother was at around 6.30pm before he went out. Png's father said that while his son had a short temper, he loved singing, liked making friends and often hang out with them at karaoke lounges, and he would never argue with anyone else. In fact, Png was supposed to go out with his friends for a karaoke session that night before he was murdered. Witnesses testified that they saw an injured Png running for a distance before he collapsed and became motionless, and several drivers stopped their cars and alighted to tend to Png. Png's two friends, who were together with him at the time the attack happened, assisted the police in their investigations into Png's killing.

== Arrest and charges ==
The police classified the death of Png Hock Seng as murder, and the Special Investigation Section of the Criminal Investigation Department (CID) was put in charge of the investigations.

On 31 October 1997, a 16-year-old youth named Benedict Kho Lian Teck (Chinese: 邱连德; pinyin: Qiū Liándé; Pe̍h-ōe-jī: Khu Liân-tek), (Note: Some sources only referred to him as "Kho Lian Teck" but without his English name.) (Note: His Chinese name was also spelt as Chinese: 邱联德; pinyin: Qiū Liándé; Pe̍h-ōe-jī: Khu Liân-tek in another source, with a similar pronunciation but different Chinese words) allegedly a member of a gang, was reportedly arrested and charged with murder for allegedly causing the death of Png Hock Seng. Kho was the first suspect to be charged in this case. District Judge See Kee Oon ordered Kho to be remanded in police custody to assist in police investigations.

On 1 November 1997, 18-year-old Ong Kian Heng (Chinese: 王建兴; pinyin: Wáng Jiànxīng; Pe̍h-ōe-jī: Ông Kiàn-heng) became the second person to be charged with murder. Three days later, on 4 November 1997, 18-year-old Koh Boon Wee (Chinese: 许文伟; pinyin: Xǔ Wénwěi; Pe̍h-ōe-jī: Khó͘ Bûn-úi; alias Martin Koh) (Note: His Chinese name was also spelt as Chinese: 高文辉; pinyin: Gāo Wénhuī; Pe̍h-ōe-jī: Kau Bûn-hui in another source) was charged with Png's murder. Although this went unreported, the police managed to arrest four more suspects, and altogether, seven teenagers, who all belonged to the same gang an aged between 16 and 18, were apprehended and found to be responsible for the murder of Png Hock Seng.

Although all the seven youths were together charged with murdering Png Hock Seng, it eventually became known by June 1998 that only one of them, 18-year-old Allan Tan Kei Loon (born 13 October 1979), who surrendered himself on 4 February 1998, was left facing a murder charge while the other six teenagers had their charges reduced. Offenders aged 18 and above could be sentenced to death under the law if found guilty of murder.

== Motive and attack ==
The following was the official version of the murder of Png Hock Seng, based on the court documents, statement of facts provided by the seven accused and evidence collected by the police.

It was recounted that prior to the murder, Benedict Kho Lian Teck, one of the youths involved in the murder, and his friends were attacked by several members of the Sio Gi Ho gang at Bugis Junction shopping mall. Kho, who belonged to the Sio Koon Tong gang, sought the help of his own gang to seek revenge, and six members of the gang, together with Kho, were dispatched to look for the Sio Gi Ho gang and retaliate. The seven members gathered at Dhoby Ghaut MRT station, where they encountered Png and his two friends coming out of a taxi. The group approached Png, and asked him which gang did he belong to. Png, who happened to be part of Sio Gi Ho but was not involved in the earlier gang clash, replied that he was a member of Sio Gi Ho, and upon receiving the answer, the group started to attack Png without further verifying any of his involvement in the incident.

One of the youths, identified as Yeo Hsi Tsung (Chinese: 杨恩聪; pinyin: Yáng Ēncōng; Pe̍h-ōe-jī: Iôⁿ Ern-chhong), allegedly stood guard over Png's two friends on the side and stopped them from intervening, while the rest sprang upon Png, who was kicked and punched multiple times. At one point, while Png was keeling down and warding the blows by covering his head, one of the attackers, Allan Tan Kei Loon, charged at him and plunged the knife into Png's back only once. Tan had earlier bought two knives and provided one for one of his fellow gang members while arming himself with the other. This single stab wound inflicted by Tan mortally wounded Png and he died soon after the group ended their attack upon seeing that he was down.

== Trial proceedings ==
=== Trial of the first four accused ===
On 17 June 1998, four of the seven offenders became the first to stand trial for their roles in the murder of Png Hock Seng. The four youths - 17-year-old salesman Benedict Kho Lian Teck, 18-year-old Ong Kian Heng, 18-year-old sales promoter Koh Boon Wei and 18-year-old food stall assistant Yeo Hsi Tsung - pleaded guilty to lesser charges of rioting before District Judge Daniel Koh, who reportedly quoted that it was disconcerting to see the rise in rioting offences being committed in public. Official statistics showed that there were a total of 478 rioting offences committed in 1997, 518 in 1996 and 361 in 1995.

Out of the four, Kho was sentenced to 18 months' jail and five strokes of the cane, while both Koh and Ong were each given five strokes of the cane and 24 months' jail, and Yeo received the most severe sentence of 30 months' jail and five strokes of the cane. Aside from this, Yeo, who was previously convicted of becoming part of an unlawful assembly, faced an unrelated charge of rioting in March 1996 and received a concurrent 12-month sentence, and both Ong and Koh were each given a concurrent sentence of six months' jail for association with an unlawful assembly in September 1996, and a third charge of theft against Ong was taken into consideration during sentencing.

=== Trial of Allan Tan Kei Loon ===
On 8 August 1998, 18-year-old Allan Tan Kei Loon, who formerly worked as a part-time waiter, stood trial for the killing of Png Hock Seng. By then, Tan's original murder charge was reduced to culpable homicide not amounting to murder, also known as manslaughter in Singapore's legal terms. The reduction of the charge allowed Tan to escape the death penalty for murdering Png, but he faced a possible sentence of up to ten years' jail or life imprisonment with a possible fine or caning. Tan pleaded guilty before Judicial Commissioner Tay Yong Kwang at a hearing convened at the High Court.

The prosecution sought the maximum sentence of life imprisonment and 24 strokes of the cane for Tan, and Deputy Public Prosecutor (DPP) Foo Cheong Ming highlighted that the violence exhibited was "wanton and senseless" by nature, and the fatal attack on Png was "brutal, savage and unjustified". He stated that Png had in no way caused any provocation despite being the rival gang member and the killing of Png took place on a Saturday and in the public, and the prosecution stated that Tan should be severely punished with the highest penalty possible to uphold the need to safeguard public safety and order.

On the other hand, the defence lawyer Fong Weng Khai submitted in mitigation that Tan's father, with whom Tan was close to, died of throat cancer three years ago in July 1995 and it was an emotional blow to Tan, who could not concentrate on his studies and gave up retaking his N-levels, and compounded by his mother's loss of her job as a hawker and his younger brother bring transferred to his relatives' care due to financial difficulties, Tan had to work in various jobs and subsequently joined the gang for protection while he worked as a waiter in a Boat Quay restaurant. he asked for leniency for Tan.

By the order of Abdul Nasir Amer Hamsah's landmark appeal on 20 August 1997, life imprisonment is to be defined as a term of incarceration lasting the remainder of a convict's natural life, instead of the old definition of life imprisonment as 20 years in prison. The changes to the law was to be applied to future cases that took place after 20 August 1997. Since Tan committed the crime of manslaughter on 25 October 1997, two months after the landmark ruling, and if he were to be sentenced to life in prison, Tan would be imprisoned for the rest of his natural life.

On that same day, Judicial Commissioner Tay Yong Kwang delivered his decision on sentence. He rejected the prosecution's arguments for life imprisonment in Tan's case, stating that he took into consideration both Tan's lack of criminal records and his young age of 17 or 18 at the time of the killing, and he also pointed out that with life imprisonment being presently construed as a natural life jail term rather than 20 years, he decided that it would be manifestly excessive to allow Tan be jailed for the remainder of his whole life after balancing out the aggravating and mitigating factors of his case. As such, Judicial Commissioner Tay sentenced 18-year-old Allan Tan to seven years in jail and nine strokes of the cane.

=== Trial of the last two youths ===
It was confirmed through the Chinese newspaper Lianhe Wanbao coverage of Tan's sentencing that the remaining two offenders, identified by Chinese newspapers as Andy Ng Guohao (Chinese: 黄国豪; pinyin: Huáng Guóháo; Pe̍h-ōe-jī: N̂g Kok-hô) and Stanley Chin Jiachun (Chinese: 郑家春; pinyin: Zhèng Jiāchūn; Jyutping: Zeng6 Gaa1 Ceon1), would stand trial the following week after Tan's trial, but the duo's sentences or convictions were not made known to the public.

== Prosecution's appeal of Allan Tan's sentence ==
Allan Tan Kei Loon, who escaped life imprisonment despite the prosecution's appeal

On 5 October 1998, the prosecution appealed against Allan Tan's sentence of seven years' jail and nine strokes of the cane, stating that the punishment was manifestly inadequate and they pressed for a life sentence and 24 strokes of the cane as a substitute to Tan's sentence. Deputy Public Prosecutor (DPP) Francis Tseng argued before the Court of Appeal that there was a need to uphold the protection of public safety and order, and life imprisonment should be a benchmark sentence for offenders of gang-related killings, and DPP Tseng described this category of criminals as "hoodlums who loot and shoot innocent bystanders without caring a hoot", highlighting that in cases of gang fights, the innocent bystanders were often being injured or even killed as a result of mistaken identities. DPP Tseng put forward that the sentence of manslaughter should not be lower than the highest punishment for rape, which was 20 years' jail and 24 strokes of the cane. In DPP Tseng's words, he quoted, "A victim of rape can recover from the trauma and get on with life. But this privilege is completely denied to a victim of culpable homicide."

In rebuttal, Tan's lawyer Raymond Lye urged the Court of Appeal to uphold Tan's sentence and dismiss the prosecution's appeal. He directed the appellate court to the then-present nature of the street gangs in Singapore, describing them as nothing more than just teenagers and youths who called themselves gangs to give themselves "a misconceived higher standing". He also stated that the situation of secret societies in Singapore was unlike Macau, "where the triads have run wild" by committing serious crimes more frequently, and hence, it was not viable to set up a benchmark sentence for gang-related killings in Singapore.

After some deliberation, the Court of Appeal's three-judge panel - consisting of Justice L P Thean (Thean Lip Ping), Justice Lai Kew Chai and Justice M Karthigesu - decided to reject the prosecution's appeal for a life term. In their full grounds of decision, the three judges disagreed with the prosecution's need for a blanket ruling determined for people convicted of gangland killings, and they stated that every gangland homicide could arise due to different reasons. Before touching on Tan's sentence, the Court of Appeal proceeded to address the issue of life imprisonment, which was no longer construed as a jail term of 20 years but presently a period of incarceration for the rest of one's natural life, and the legal implications of such a change in terms of sentencing offenders for the crime of manslaughter. Noting that the length of life imprisonment had currently changed from "20 years" to "natural life", they felt that this signaled the courts' need to be cautious before committing an offender, especially a young person, to life behind bars.

Extracted from Public Prosecutor v Tan Kei Loon Allan [1998] 3 SLR(R) 679:

On the question whether a sentence of life imprisonment was appropriate, we were naturally impressed by the implications of our decision in Abdul Nasir. Certainly, even with R119A, a sentence of life is now much harsher than it was before our ruling in Abdul Nasir. Whereas an accused person previously would serve a maximum sentence of 20 years, with a potential remission commuting his sentence to one of 13 years and 4 months, he must now serve a minimum of 20 years’ imprisonment, at which point his release would be within the discretion of a Life Imprisonment Review Board. So, the minimum period of incarceration is now six years and eight months longer, whilst the maximum period of incarceration, previously 20 years, is now the remainder of the prisoner's natural life. In this context it is equally important to note that under the old position, his release after 20 years would have been guaranteed, but a prisoner sentenced for life in respect of a crime committed after Abdul Nasir has no such peace of mind.

In that respect, we are of the view that the courts must now exercise caution before committing a young offender to life imprisonment. Contrary to traditional reasoning, in similar cases involving a youthful offender on the one hand and an older offender in the other, the youthful offender sentenced to life imprisonment would now be subject to a longer period of incarceration than an older offender, assuming they both lived to the same age.

Justice Lai Kew Chai, who delivered the verdict, highlighted the strenuous limitations of sentencing an offender to either life or up to ten years, given that judges cannot impose sentences of more than ten years but less than life, which would leave judges with the dilemma that a life term may be an excessive punishment for an offender convicted of manslaughter, which was exactly the case for Tan based on the mitigating and aggravating factors of his case. In his own words, Justice Lai quoted that in a situation in which the court wanted to impose a jail term longer than ten years but found that life imprisonment was excessive, the court would "have no choice but to come down, however reluctantly, on the side of leniency" and mete out a sentence of not more than ten years. Justice Lai also pointed out that it would be wrong for the courts to adopt an approach to "prefer an excessive sentence to an inadequate one", which would potentially led to the punishment itself exceeding the culpability of the offender.

Although they dismissed the prosecution's appeal, the Court of Appeal agreed with the prosecution that on the balance of probabilities, Tan's seven-year jail term and nine strokes of the cane were manifestly inadequate to address the magnitude of his crime. Other factors taken note by the Court of Appeal were that Tan was alone armed with a deadly weapon and was the one who inflicted the fatal injuries on the victim Png Hock Seng, as well as the attack having occurred in a public place and had gangland affiliations, and it occurred with no provocation and Png himself was outnumbered. Therefore, the appellate court opted for a higher punishment and hence increased 18-year-old Allan Tan Kei Loon's sentence to the second-highest sentence of ten years' imprisonment, in addition to 15 strokes of the cane.

== Aftermath ==
Since the end of the prosecution's appeal, Allan Tan served his ten-year sentence at Changi Prison and he was released since 2008. His six accomplices, who were all dealt with by the law, were similarly released since then after completing their sentences for their part in the killing of Png Hock Seng.

The prosecution's appeal against the sentence of Tan was a landmark decision that impacted the legal history of Singapore, which directly carried on the legacy of Abdul Nasir Amer Hamsah's landmark appeal. It was often referred to by judges in cases of manslaughter, where the judges highlighted the judiciary's dilemma in deciding between ten years' jail and a life sentence, given that life imprisonment was no longer a fixed period of 20 years but the rest of one's natural life behind bars and it signaled the judges' need to be more cautious in sentencing an offender to life imprisonment, which might potentially exceed the culpability of the offender. Members of the legal community also made calls to the government to allow the judiciary to have wider sentencing options in the cases of criminals found guilty of manslaughter. Additionally, it also set the principles on whether a young offender was deserving of a life sentence based on the careful consideration of various circumstances in the offender's case.

The Allan Tan case was referred to by the courts in the cases of Muhamad Hasik Sahar and Norhisham Mohamed Dahlan, who were both Salakau gang members convicted of the manslaughter of a 17-year-old national soccer player Sulaiman Hashim in 2001, and the prosecution sought life sentences for both boys. In the case of Hasik, Judicial Commissioner Tay Yong Kwang compared Tan's case to that of Hasik, stating that although Hasik was not armed with weapons like Tan and did not cause the fatal knife wounds on Sulaiman, Hasik was previously convicted of a crime related to physical violence in 1996 unlike Tan (who had no criminal records) and he even continued beating Sulaiman even after Norhisham and two of the other six offenders stabbed Sulaiman. For this, Judicial Commissioner Tay sentenced Hasik to life in prison and 16 strokes of the cane on the grounds that he never learnt his lesson even after his previous brush with the law for a violent offence.

On the other hand, for the case of Norhisham, who was tried in a separate court hearing, Justice Woo Bih Li referred to the precedent case of Allan Tan and noted that Norhisham's culpability was much higher than Allan Tan, as Norhisham was the mastermind and pre-planned the attack unlike Tan, and Norhisham's culpability exceeded even that of Hasik due to him being directly involved in the stabbing of Sulaiman, and he also did not surrender himself and chose to flee to Malaysia before his arrest. Justice Woo, however, stated that Norhisham previously went to jail for non-violent crimes and the fatal stabbing of Sulaiman was his first violent offence to date, and hence Justice Woo found it inappropriate to impose life imprisonment since Norhisham, compared to Hasik, should not be treated akin to a criminal who previously committed violent offences, and hence meted out a jail term of ten years with 16 strokes of the cane.

The case of Aniza Essa, who manipulated her underaged boyfriend to murder her abusive husband in 2007, also made reference to the precedent case of Allan Tan. Aniza pleaded guilty to manslaughter after her murder charge was reduced on the grounds of diminished responsibility. Justice Chan Seng Onn, who convicted Aniza, found that despite the cold-blooded nature of the killing and the abhorrent nature of her conduct, Aniza's actions were a result of impaired mental faculties caused by depression at the time and it also affected her judgement, and her depression arose due to her husband's abusive behaviour. Justice Chan also stated that Aniza's condition was moderately severe and could still be addressed by treatment and her chances of re-offending were low, and it would be excessive to sentence her to life in jail due to the Allan Tan principles of required caution in sentencing a young offender to life imprisonment. Hence, Justice Chan handed her a jail term of nine years despite the prosecution's arguments for life imprisonment.

In 2008, the government officially passed laws to enable judges the discretion to decide between life imprisonment or up to 20 years in jail for those convicted of manslaughter.

== See also ==
- Caning in Singapore
- Life imprisonment in Singapore
- List of major crimes in Singapore
