= Murder of Jaswant Singh =

1988 murder of a taxi driver in Old Toh Tuck Road, Singapore

- Date: 4 May 1988
- Location: Old Toh Tuck Road, Singapore
- Motive: Robbery
- Deaths: Jaswant Singh, 48
- Convicted: Amuthan Murugasu, 17; Narayanasamy Jairam, 17; Murgan Ramasamy, 18; Ganesan Suppiah, 21
- Sentence: Murgan - Death penalty Ganesan - 78 months' jail and 12 strokes of the cane Narayanasamy - five years' jail and 12 strokes of the cane Amuthan - five years' jail and 12 strokes of the cane

On 4 May 1988, while he was driving to Old Toh Tuck Road, 48-year-old taxi driver Jaswant Singh was robbed by four people (who boarded his taxi), and he died eight days later in a coma, as a result of the grievous injuries he suffered. The four suspects, who were all male, were arrested between 1989 and 1990 and charged with murder. Eventually, only one of the assailants, Murgan Ramasamy, was found guilty of murder and sentenced to death in March 1993. After losing his appeal and death row plea for clemency, Murgan was hanged on 16 September 1994. The remaining three attackers were instead found guilty of lesser charges of robbery with hurt, and sentenced to jail terms between five years and 78 months, in addition to caning (12 strokes for each of the three).

== Robbery and death ==
On 4 May 1988, a taxi driver was attacked by his four passengers at a secluded area near Old Toh Tuck Road, where the attackers asked him to drive to after hailing his taxi earlier at 2am. The taxi driver, Jaswant Singh, was stabbed and mortally wounded on his neck and he also had his wallet (containing about S$60 in cash), watch, and ring stolen by the four robbers, whom he described as male and were all young men. Ten minutes after the assailants fled the scene, Jaswant managed to stagger out of his taxi and seek help from the driver of a passing truck despite his injuries, and he was rushed to National University Hospital.

Despite receiving medical treatment, Jaswant slipped into a coma and his condition never improved. Jaswant eventually died on 12 May 1988, eight days after the brutal robbery. Jaswant was 48 years old at the time he died, and he left behind a wife and three children (two sons and one daughter). Jaswant's 21-year-old younger son, Amerjeet Singh (the youngest of three children), stated that his father had no enemies and thus he believed the motive was a robbery and he stated it was senseless that a brutal thing had befallen on his father.

Jaswant was not the only taxi driver who became a victim of either murder or disappearance during the year of 1988 itself; another case happened in July 1988 while a third occurred in September 1988, and one went missing in May 1988. At least three cases of murder involving the deaths of taxi drivers had happened that year in total.

== Arrests ==
The police conducted their investigations in the case of Jaswant's murder and publicly appealed for witnesses who last saw the taxi in the area before the murder, but there were no results and no suspects were arrested despite efforts to crack the case. Five months later, Singaporean crime show Crimewatch re-enacted the case in November 1988 and police also released a second public appeal through the episode, calling for witnesses to come forward with any information that could lead to the arrest of the suspects behind Jaswant's death.

On 3 June 1989, 18-year-old Amuthan Murugasu, who was unemployed, became the first person arrested for allegedly killing Jaswant Singh, nearly a year after the taxi driver was killed. Amuthan, who was reportedly one of the four youths involved in the killing, was charged with murder two days later.

On 3 July 1989, an 18-year-old jobless teenager surrendered himself to the authorities and admitted his involvement in the killing. The boy, whose name was Narayanasamy Jairam, became the second person to face a murder charge about the case. The police were also investigating to identify the remaining two assailants responsible for the murder.

On 28 January 1990, a third suspect, identified as 20-year-old Murgan Ramasamy, was apprehended and charged in court for the murder of Jaswant.

On 3 February 1990, an unemployed man named Ganesan Suppiah became the fourth and final suspect to be charged with murdering Jaswant Singh back in 1988. Ganesan was 20 at the time of the crime.

Under the laws of Singapore, if they were found guilty of murder, the four suspects - Amuthan, Narayanasamy, Murgan and Ganesan - would be sentenced to death, because the death penalty was mandatory for murder and judges in Singapore had no discretion (up until 2013) to sentence murder offenders to any other punishment aside from death.

== Court proceedings and outcome ==
=== Fates of Amuthan, Narayanasamy and Ganesan ===
Eventually, after some pre-trial proceedings, the murder charges against three of the four offenders - Amuthan, Ganesan, and Narayanasamy - were reduced to robbery with hurt. The three were dealt in court for the lesser offence in February 1993 and received the following sentences: 22-year-old Amuthan Murugasu and 21-year-old Narayanasamy Jairam were each sentenced to five years jail and 12 strokes of the cane, while 26-year-old Ganesan Suppiah was sentenced to a heavier jail term of 78 months (equivalent to six years and six months), in addition to 12 strokes of the cane.

=== Trial and sentence of Murgan ===
As a result, Murgan Ramasamy was the sole person left facing a murder charge for killing the taxi driver. Since Murgan was 18 years old (but also nearing his 19th birthday) at the time of the murder, he was still liable for a death sentence for murder under the law since offenders aged 18 and above can be sentenced to death in Singapore's jurisdiction. Judicial Commissioner Kan Ting Chiu was the presiding judge of Murgan's trial, which took place at the High Court, where capital cases were heard and tried.

During Murgan's murder trial, the court heard that on 3 May 1988, the night before the robbery, Murgan, and his three accomplices spent their night out having meals and consuming both sleeping pills and alcohol at a coffee shop, and after they found that they had spent all their money, they decided to pretend to be passengers hailing for a taxi and rob the taxi driver. It happened so that the taxi they hailed was driven by the deceased victim Jaswant Singh, who unknowingly picked up the men without knowing their plot. At 2am on 4 May 1988, the four entered Jaswant's taxi and asked him to drive them from Jurong West to Old Toh Tuck Road. After reaching a secluded area of their destination, the four youths began to attack Jaswant, restraining him and stealing his valuables, mainly his ring, wrist watch, and wallet.

During the scuffle, Murgan picked up a screwdriver and viciously stabbed Jaswant in the neck about five to six times, although Murgan insisted in court that he only stabbed the victim once. According to Dr Wee Keng Poh, a forensic pathologist who examined Jaswant's corpse, the neck injuries was severe enough to result in brain death and in turn, the death of the victim eight days after the attack. A medical surgeon who operated on Jaswant also testified that the stabbing of the victim's neck led to the severance of a major blood vessel. Aside from this, the court also heard that after the robbery, the four left the crime scene and boarded another taxi to go to a friend's house at Bukit Batok.

On 11 March 1993, Judicial Commissioner Kan delivered his verdict after the trial ended. In his judgment, Judicial Commissioner Kan rejected Murgan's defence that he only stabbed the victim once on the neck, and instead, he accepted both the forensic evidence and the testimony of one of Murgan's accomplices Ganesan (who came to court as a witness), finding that Murgan had indeed stabbed Jaswant on the neck for five to six times and he had intentionally inflicted these bodily injuries on Jaswant, such that the wounds were sufficient in the ordinary course of nature to cause death, and hence, Judicial Commissioner Kan determined that Murgan should be held responsible for the offence of murder.

As a result, 23-year-old Murgan Ramasamy was found guilty of murder and sentenced to death. Murgan was one of the four people to be given a death sentence within the week itself; one of the other three include Angel Mou Pui Peng, a Macau-born Hong Kong resident who trafficked 4 kg of heroin in 1991, and Yap Biew Hian, who killed his co-tenant in 1990. Both were since executed - Mou's execution was confirmed to be carried out on 6 January 1995.

== Murgan's execution ==
After the conclusion of his trial, Murgan filed an appeal against his conviction and sentence, but on 26 January 1994, the Court of Appeal dismissed Murgan's appeal and upheld his death sentence and murder conviction. In the aftermath, Murgan petitioned for clemency in a final bid to commute his death sentence to life in prison, but then President of Singapore Ong Teng Cheong rejected Murgan's clemency plea and finalized his death sentence.

On 16 September 1994, 24-year-old Murgan Ramasamy was hanged at Changi Prison.

== See also ==
- Capital punishment in Singapore
