= Murder of Nurdin Nguan Song =

1985 murder of an Indonesian fish merchant in Singapore

Nurdin Nguan Song
- Nurdin Nguan Song, who was killed by two hitmen over a business dispute
- Born: Nurdin Nguan Song; 1952; Tanjong Pinang, Rhio Islands, Indonesia
- Died: 13 November 1985 (aged 33); Waterloo Street, Singapore
- Cause of death: Murdered by stabbing
- Other names: Nurdin Guan Song
- Occupation: Fish merchant
- Known for: Murder victim
- Spouse(s): Unnamed first wife Heng Eng Booi (second wife)
- Children: 5

On 13 November 1985, 33-year-old Indonesian fish merchant Nurdin Nguan Song (阮颂 Ruăn Sòng) was murdered at a hotel along Waterloo Street, Singapore. Nurdin died after he was slashed and stabbed repeatedly by two men, who were revealed to have been paid by Nurdin's business rival to attack him. Between 1988 and 1992, the two murderers were arrested after spending several years on the run from the police, and charged with murder. One of them, a Malaysian named Loh Yoon Seong (罗勇向 Luó Yǒngxiàng), was found guilty of murdering Nurdin and sentenced to death, while the other, a Singaporean named Tan Swee Hoon (陈瑞云 Chén Rùiyún), pleaded guilty to manslaughter and for having killed Nurdin and committed an armed robbery while on the run, Tan was jailed for 23 years and given 24 strokes of the cane.

== Murder ==
On 13 November 1985, a man was attacked by two armed assailants at the South East Asia Hotel along Waterloo Street, Singapore.

The victim was 33-year-old Nurdin Nguan Song, a Chinese-Indonesian and fish merchant who came from Tanjong Pinang of the Indonesian Rhio Islands and often supplied fish to fishmongers in Singapore. At the time of his death, Nurdin was on a holiday and stayed at the hotel with his 18-year-old second wife Heng Eng Booi, with whom Nurdin had a two-year-old son. Nurdin was apparently attacked after he opened the door, responding to a supposed room service. Heng witnessed the attack and she ran out of the room seeking help. A 43-year-old hotel manager Lim Tee Teng witnessed Heng running while calling for help, and he later on witnessed the two attackers escaping the hotel. Lim tried to stop one of the attackers by grabbing him, but the man, who reportedly carried a parang, slashed Lim on the arm once and inflicted another two slash wounds on his head. Lim managed to survive the assault, but Nurdin, who sustained at least nine wounds on his head, hands and body, died shortly after he arrived at a hospital.

Further background information revealed that Nurdin's first wife was residing in Indonesia, and Nurdin had four more children (two sons and two daughters) with his first wife. Nurdin's second wife was distraught over the incident, and both she and Nurdin's first wife cried at the death of their husband, and they reportedly wanted justice to be served.

The police classified the case as murder and they set out a manhunt for possible suspects responsible for the killing. They speculated the motive to be a possible revenge instead of robbery, as the cash and valuables belonging to the couple were left untouched by the murderers. The police recovered a brown bag, which was dropped by one of the killers during his struggle with the hotel manager Lim. Based on the identity card and other contents of the bag, the police managed to establish the identity of one of the assailants, who was identified as Loh Yoon Seong, a Malaysian from Ipoh who worked as a fitter in Singapore. However, Loh had left Singapore by the time his identity was established, and he was therefore placed on the wanted list for the murder of Nurdin Nguan Song, while the police continued to investigate to identify the other attacker.

== Trial of Loh Yoon Seong ==
=== Loh's arrest ===
Loh Yoon Seong, who was arrested in Malaysia three years after murdering Nurdin Nguan Song

On 26 January 1988, the Royal Malaysia Police finally traced the whereabouts of one of the suspects, Loh Yoon Seong, and he was arrested at Kuala Lumpur, Malaysia. It turned out that two days earlier, a man carrying a passport belonging to Loh was arrested at the Woodlands Checkpoint, and the man, who was a friend of Loh, told the police that he was entrusted by Loh to use his passport to enter Singapore and see if it was still safe for him to re-enter Singapore. This allowed the authorities to obtain information of his whereabouts and led to his arrest in Malaysia and subsequent extradition to Singapore on 28 January 1988, where he was expected to be charged with murder.

On 29 January 1988, 30-year-old Loh Yoon Seong was officially charged with murdering Nurdin Nguan Song back in 1985. Loh was the first person to be charged in the case, although at that point of time, his accomplice was still at large for the killing.

On 10 May 1988, after a preliminary hearing, Loh's case was transferred to the High Court for trial hearing on a date to be decided.

=== Court proceedings ===
On 2 July 1988, Loh Yoon Seong stood trial for one count of murder at the High Court. Loh was represented by Chen Zhen Xiang while the prosecution was led by Deputy Public Prosecutor (DPP) Seng Kwang Boon. The trial was presided by Justice T S Sinnathuray and Judicial Commissioner M Karthigesu.

The trial court was told that before the murder, Nurdin had a business dispute with his rival and another Indonesian fish trader, who went by his nickname "Tee Tee", and out of hatred towards Nurdin, "Tee Tee" hired a man to help him attack Nurdin to "teach him a lesson". In turn, the hired assailant enlisted the help of Loh to attack Nurdin, which ultimately resulted in Nurdin's death. At that point of time, Loh's accomplice, as well as the alleged mastermind "Tee Tee", remained at large for the murder.

On the night of 13 November 1985, after tracing Nurdin's whereabouts to a hotel at Waterloo Street, where he was staying with his second wife, and finding out the room where the couple stayed, Loh and his accomplice armed themselves with a parang and metal file respectively, and went to the hotel to initiate their planned attack. Both men knocked on the door of Nurdin's room, pretending to be hotel staff wanting to replenish the drinking water of the room, and Nurdin opened the door after falling to their ruse. Upon entry, Loh and his accomplice rushed in and mercilessly attacked Nurdin, who was taken by surprise and got stabbed and slashed by the two attackers. Nurdin's second wife witnessed the attack but was left unharmed throughout. As a result of the brutal attack, Nurdin died. An autopsy revealed that Nurdin sustained nine slash wounds and four stab wounds on the chest, head and hands, and the cause of his death was a stab wound to his heart.

In his defense, Loh stated he only wanted to teach Nurdin a lesson on the orders of "Tee Tee" and he never intended to cause death but only to injure Nurdin. This was, however, rebutted by the prosecution, as they argued that Loh and his accomplice had armed themselves with dangerous weapons beforehand, and this led to an inference that both men had the intention to commit murder, and hence they sought a guilty verdict of murder for Loh.

=== Verdict ===
On 10 July 1990, after a trial lasting five days, Judicial Commissioner M Karthigesu and Justice T S Sinnathuray delivered their verdict.

In their verdict, the two trial judges agreed with the prosecution that Loh and the missing accomplice had the intent to commit murder, given that they had armed themselves with lethal weapons as part of their plan to go after Nurdin on the orders of "Tee Tee". Due to this, they rejected Loh's defence of not having the intent to cause death during the attack, and since the attack was intentional and it led to the death of Nurdin, both Judicial Commissioner Karthigesu and Justice Sinnathuray concluded that there were sufficient grounds to return with a guilty verdict of murder in Loh's case.

As such, 32-year-old Loh Yoon Seong was found guilty of murder and sentenced to death. Under Singaporean law, a person convicted of murder would be given the mandatory death penalty, and it would be carried out by long drop hanging, the standard execution method in Singapore. Loh's godmother was the only family member present at the hearing when the death penalty was pronounced, and she was saddened at the verdict. Loh himself was reportedly silent and despondent at the judgement.

=== Loh's appeal ===
After he was sentenced to hang, Loh filed an appeal against his death sentence and murder conviction. However, on 25 October 1991, Loh's appeal was rejected by the Court of Appeal, after the three appellate judges - Chief Justice Yong Pung How, Justice S. Rajendran and Justice Goh Joon Seng - rejected his defences against the murder charge. The prosecution had also argued prior in the appeal hearing that Loh's actions of stabbing Nurdin with a knife intentionally and having caused Nurdin's death from the stabbing were in line with Section 300(c) of the Penal Code, which defined murder as an act of intentionally inflicting an injury sufficient in the ordinary course of nature to cause death, and there was no need to prove any motive or any intent to cause death in order to convict a person of murder. With his death sentence upheld, Loh remained on death row awaiting his execution, and while he did so, his accomplice was arrested less than a year after he lost the appeal.

== Trial of Tan Swee Hoon ==
=== Tan's arrest ===
Tan Swee Hoon, who lived seven years as a fugitive before his arrest for Nurdin's murder

Seven years after the murder of Nurdin Nguan Song, Loh Yoon Seong's accomplice was finally arrested in March 1992.

The second suspect, identified as 40-year-old Singaporean and freelance welder Tan Swee Hoon (alias Raymond Tan), was arrested for an armed robbery case and the police managed to uncover his involvement behind the murder of Nurdin. This revelation led to Tan being charged with murder after his arrest. As for the other case which Tan was caught for, he had committed armed robbery in February 1992 with two other people. The facts of the robbery was that Tan and a gunman named Hoo Kek Fu had robbed a pair of brothers, Neo Ban San and Neo Ban Hin, at gunpoint at Lim Chu Kang. Both men managed to steal at least S$17,500, a wallet and a handphone from the brothers and they escaped with the help of a third man Lim Loo Kok. Therefore, Tan was charged with two counts of armed robbery for robbing the Neo brothers while armed with an axe, and remanded while awaiting trial for armed robbery and murder.

51-year-old Hoo Kek Fu, the gunman who helped Tan commit the robbery, was found guilty and sentenced in August 1992 to seven years' preventive detention, a special type of imprisonment for recalcitrant offenders aged 30 and above and with three or more previous convictions. Hoo's detention order was increased to 20 years upon the prosecution's appeal in November 1992. As for 35-year-old Lim Loo Kok, the third accomplice, he was tried in September 1992 and sentenced to 12 strokes of the cane and a jail term of five years and six months for the charge of abetting both Tan and Hoo to commit the robbery and their escape. A fourth man, 51-year-old Lee Hai Chue, was given a five-year jail term in August 1992 for providing Hoo with a revolver to commit the robbery.

=== Plea of guilt and sentencing ===
On 18 June 1993, Tan pleaded guilty to two armed robbery charges for robbing the Neo brothers, as well as a reduced charge of culpable homicide not amounting to murder (or manslaughter) for killing Nurdin back in 1985, after the prosecution agreed to the defence's request to reduce the murder charge, which ultimately allowed Tan to escape the death penalty for murdering Nurdin.

Deputy Public Prosecutor P O Ram argued that Tan should be sentenced to the maximum penalty of life imprisonment, on the grounds that he had committed multiple violent offences and a harsh punishment was warranted. In response, Tan's defence counsel Michael Teo and Liew Chen Mine argued that Tan should not be jailed for the rest of his natural life and it would be unfair to have the other jail terms for armed robbery to run consecutively with a life sentence for manslaughter, and this led to the trial court inquiring the prosecution about whether life imprisonment was supposed to be a jail term of 20 years or the remainder of one's natural life, causing the trial session to be adjourned for five days to allow the prosecution time to make a reply. In fact, before the landmark appeal of Abdul Nasir Amer Hamsah on 20 August 1997, life imprisonment in Singapore was considered as a jail term of 20 years instead of natural life.

The prosecution however, did not reply, and instead, during the resumption of the trial, they re-submitted that Tan should serve the maximum sentence of 20 years' preventive detention for the offences he had been convicted for, and they no longer urged the court to sentence Tan to life in prison. Tan, who was widowed with one 17-year-old son, pleaded for leniency and stated that he had become a Christian while in prison and deeply regretted his actions, and hoped to be a useful member of society before he became too old.

On 23 June 1993, Judicial Commissioner M P H Rubin delivered his verdict on sentence. He stated that there was a need for harsh punishments on those who were prone to violence and they should not be expected to be treated with leniency. He also pointed out that Tan was armed with dangerous weapons for both the killing of Nurdin and robbery of the Neo brothers, and Tan had ruthlessly resorted to violence in the case of Nurdin, which ended with the death of Nurdin in cold blood. Judicial Commissioner Rubin, however, accepted that Tan was ashamed and remorseful, and had pleaded guilty. Therefore, the judge imposed a sentence of ten years' jail and 12 strokes of the cane for the manslaughter charge, therefore sparing Tan from both life imprisonment and preventive detention. He also imposed seven years' jail and 12 strokes of the cane for the first count of armed robbery and another six years for the second count of armed robbery, and ordered the jail terms to run consecutively from the date of Tan's arrest. In total, 41-year-old Tan Swee Hoon was sentenced to 23 years' imprisonment and 24 strokes of the cane.

== Fates of Tan and Loh ==
During the time when Tan Swee Hoon's trial was ongoing, it was confirmed through the Chinese newspapers that Loh Yoon Seong remained incarcerated on death row at Changi Prison as of June 1993. Authorities also told the press that Loh's death sentence would be carried out on a date to be decided after the conclusion of Tan's manslaughter trial. Since then, Loh was hanged in Changi Prison on an unknown date for murdering Nurdin.

In the meantime, Tan was incarcerated at Changi Prison, where he served his sentence of 23 years with effect from the date of his arrest in 1992. Tan maintained good behaviour while in prison, and he was therefore granted parole and released in 2007 after spending 15 years and a few months behind bars. He joined a non-profit organization that was aimed to help ex-convicts and former drug addicts to rehabilitate and reintegrate into society. Tan, who eventually became a staff member of the group, shared his story several years after joining the group. He stated that after leaving school in Secondary Three, he joined a gang at age 17 and therefore committed many offences, including armed robbery and rioting, and had at one point, sentenced to reformative training on two occasions. Tan also revealed his first experience with Christianity was when he met the late Reverend Khoo Seow Hua (a famous pastor of Singapore), but he never became a Christian until the time when he was caught for the murder of Nurdin Nguan Song.

Tan recounted that he was initially informed by the police that the prosecution was willing to bring down his murder charge to manslaughter, which brought him relief, but later on the same day, Tan's hopes were dashed when the same police investigator relayed to him that the Attorney-General rejected the prosecution's request, stating that since Loh was given the death penalty, Tan should also head to the gallows for the crime. Tan stated that he was devastated and lost hope after the sudden turn of events, but he eventually turned to Christianity and became devoted to his newfound faith. Through the religious guidance he received, Tan gradually grew remorseful and realized the error of his ways, and was willing to face any consequences for his actions. Tan said that after his arrest for murder, he reconnected with his sister, with whom he used to share a strained relationship, and he was also relieved after his lawyer successfully requested for the reduction of his murder charge. It was further revealed that in 2012, Tan, then 59 years old, was married with a woman from China, and since then, the couple continued to help other ex-offenders like Tan to rebuild their lives and guide them with religion.

== Aftermath ==
In 1994, Singaporean crime show Crimewatch re-enacted the murder of Nurdin Nguan Song, as well as re-enacting the crimes that one of the perpetrators, Tan Swee Hoon, committed during the seven years he spent on the run from the authorities for the murder.

As of today, Nurdin's business rival, "Tee Tee", who allegedly put a hit on Nurdin and hired both Tan and Loh to kill Nurdin, was never found.

== See also ==
- Caning in Singapore
- Capital punishment in Singapore
- List of major crimes in Singapore
