= South East Asia Hotel =

Hotel in Singapore

Coordinates: 1°18′04″N 103°51′12″E

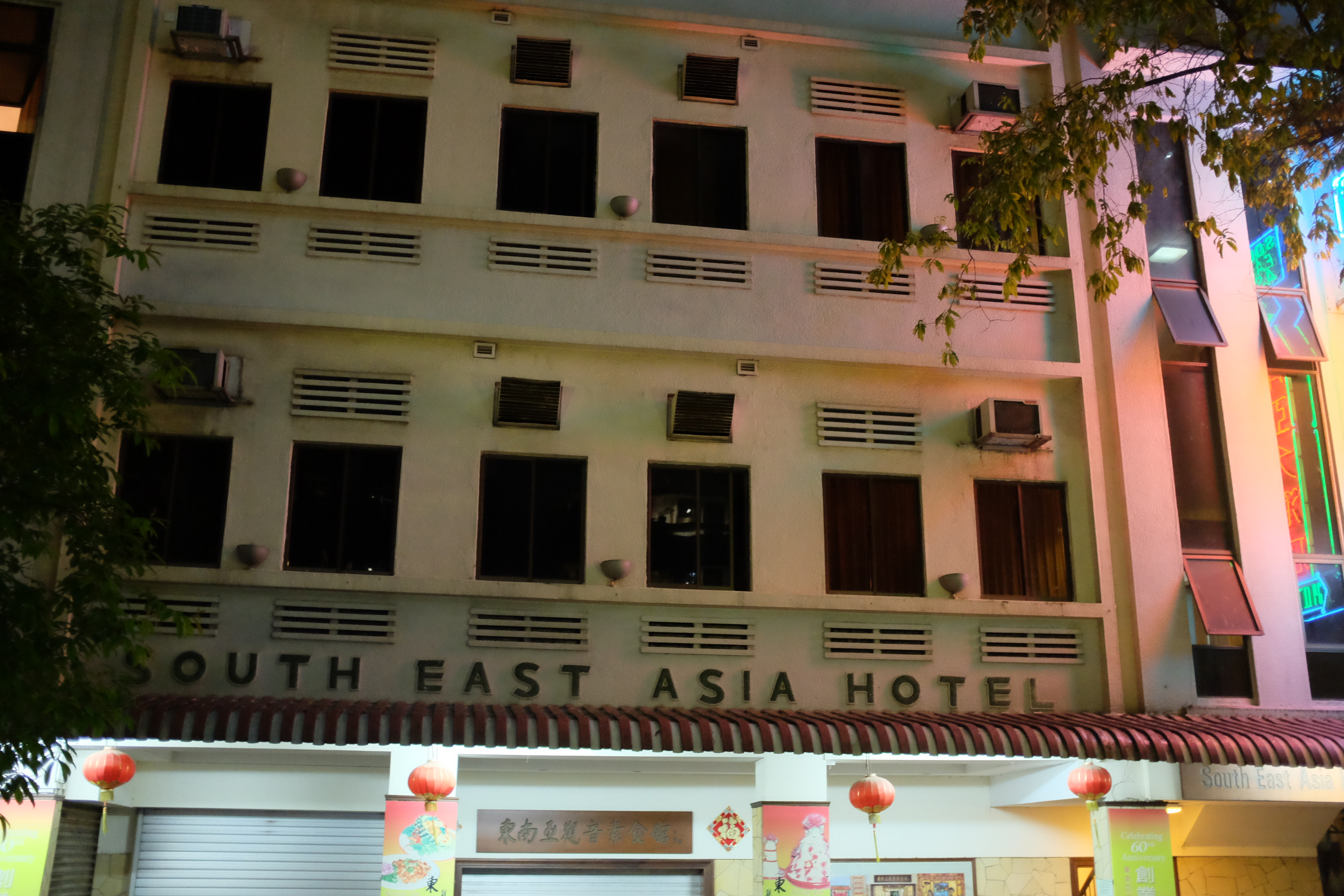
The hotel in 2013

The South East Asia Hotel is a hotel on Waterloo Street in downtown Singapore.

== History ==
Piling work on the four-storey building, which was designed by Chan Yee Lim, began in October 1952.

The building cost $600,000 and its main part was scheduled for completion by the end of August 1953. It opened on 1 October, with 34 rooms, a hall and an adjoining carpark. By March 1981, the total number of rooms at the hotel had increased to 51. Its occupants at the time were primarily European tourists and Asian businessmen.

On 13 November 1985, Indonesian fish merchant Nurdin Nguan Song was murdered at the hotel by two hitmen, who were sent by a business rival to attack Nurdin. One of them, Loh Yoon Seong, was convicted of murder and sentenced to death in 1990, while the other, Tan Swee Hoon, was jailed and caned for manslaughter and unrelated robbery charges in 1993.

In April 1986, The Business Times reported that, despite the hotel's "low" $33 to $44 rate, the hotel had seen a 20% decrease in occupancy levels from 85% in the previous year. However, it was reported in November 1989 that occupancy levels had greatly increased within the past few months.

The hotel features a "plain and simple" façade, with walls made of reinforced concrete and windows framed with metal and accompanied by fixed ventilators either above or below. It utilises hand-written ledgers for reservations. Coin-operated scales can be found by the lift and mini-televations are mounted on the walls of the hotel's rooms. In 1974, Kwan Im Restaurant a Chinese vegetarian restaurant operated by the Kwan Im Thong Hood Cho Temple next door, opened in the hotel's lobby. In May 1976, in a positive review of the restaurant for the New Nation, Violet Oon noted that the restaurant had "established a reputation for serving good food at reasonable prices." According to Roots, which is published by the National Heritage Board, the restaurant is "popularly known for providing sumptuous Chinese vegetarian cuisine."
