= Figments of Experience =

1981 collection of short stories by Gopal Baratham

First edition

Figments of Experience is a collection of short stories by Gopal Baratham. It was published in 1981 by Times Books International. It contains the following stories:

- "Welcome"
- "Vocation"
- "Love Letter"
- "The Experiment"
- "The Wafer"
- "Wedding Night"
- "Tomorrow's Brother"
- "The Interview"
- "Island"
- "Figment of Experience"
- "Confidence Trick"
- "Ghost"
- "Sundowner"
- "Ultimate Commodity"
- "Cliseemah Caloh"

The collection was later reissued, alongside his other collections People Make You Cry and Memories that Glow in the Dark, as a single collection titled The City of Forgetting, with an introduction by Ban Kah Choon.

== Editions ==
- ISBN 9971-65-094-0 (paperback, 1981)
