= Orchard Towers double murders =

2002 double murders in Singapore

- The car of Michael McCrea, which contained the decomposing corpses of Lan and Kho
- Date: 2 January 2002; 24 years ago
- Location: Balmoral Park, Singapore
- Motive: Out of provocation due to Kho's alleged insult of McCrea's girlfriend
- Deaths: Kho Nai Guan; Lan Ya Ming
- Suspects: Michael McCrea; Audrey Ong Pei Ling

The Orchard Towers double murders was the case of two deaths occurring at Balmoral Park, Singapore, before the victims' bodies were discovered at a carpark in Orchard Towers, thus the title of the case. The victims were 46-year-old Kho Nai Guan (Xǚ Naĭyuán 许乃元) and Kho's 29-year-old Chinese girlfriend Lan Ya Ming (Lán Yǎmíng 兰雅明), and they were both murdered by Kho's British employer Michael McCrea. McCrea was assisted by his girlfriend Audrey Ong Pei Ling (Wáng Peìlíng 王佩玲) in disposing of the bodies before they both fled Singapore to Australia, where they were caught.

The outcome of the case was Ong and McCrea being extradited back to Singapore in 2002 and 2005 respectively, where they were charged with offences ranging from causing disappearance of evidence to culpable homicide not amounting to murder, and sentenced to lengthy jail terms of 12 and 24 years respectively for their roles in the murders. The Orchard Towers double murder case was known to be one of the most infamous murder cases that occurred in Singapore.

== Discovery of the victims at Orchard Towers ==
Kho Nai Guan, who was stuffed in a wicker basket

Lan Ya Ming, whose head was covered in plastic bags

On 8 January 2002, a security guard named Mohammed Yaacob responded to a report relating to a silver Daewoo Chairman parked on the seventh floor of the Orchard Towers carpark, where it appeared abandoned given that it was sighted at the same spot for the past four days. As Mohammed approached the car, he detected a fetid odour coming from the car. Suspecting that something was wrong, Mohammed called the police.

Upon receiving Mohammed's police report, a team of police officers headed to the Orchard Towers car park where Mohammed found the car. The police then forced open the car and made a gruesome discovery of two decomposing corpses inside the vehicle. One of the corpses was found inside a huge wicker basket placed at the car's rear seat. The first corpse belonged to a 46-year-old Singaporean male named Kho Nai Guan. The other body was found in the boot of the car, wrapped in blankets and the head covered with plastic bags and neckties tightening the bags around the neck area. The other body was certified to be female, and her identity was Lan Ya Ming (alias Suzie Lan), a 29-year-old China-born immigrant and teacher who first came to Singapore in October 2001 to apply for a teaching job. Lan, who was Kho's girlfriend, was married with two eight-year-old twin sons at the time of her death, while Kho himself was a father of three who was estranged from his wife.

Both Kho and Lan were certified to have died from strangulation and suffocation respectively, according to the forensic pathologist Dr Paul Chui. Lan's body was later reclaimed by her 32-year-old Chinese husband and telecommunications worker Lin Jia Song ten months after her death, while Kho's family were able to recognise him from his Thai tattoos and reclaimed his body.

Lin said that before his wife was murdered, he often received weekly calls from Lan while she stayed in Singapore and the last time he heard her voice was on 29 December 2001, three days before her death. He stated she did not turn up at their family home in Fujian for Chinese New Year as she promised and he could not contact her for three months before he received the Singapore Police Force's notification that his wife possibly was the female deceased victim they found at Orchard Towers. In fact, the police could not establish Lan's identity immediately after they discovered her body and it took ten months before they finally identified her through her belongings and DNA samples provided by Lin.

Police investigations yielded the last address of both Kho and Lan, which was located in an apartment at Balmoral Park, owned by a British expatriate and financial adviser named Michael McCrea, who hired Kho as his personal driver after being impressed by the latter's driving skills as a taxi driver. The $146,000 Daewoo car, where the bodies were found, was bought and gifted to Kho by McCrea himself. However, McCrea had already left for London on 5 January 2002, three days prior to the discovery of the bodies. McCrea's 22-year-old Singaporean girlfriend, Audrey Ong Pei Ling, who lived with McCrea in the same apartment as Kho and Lan, had also left for London on the same day. The apartment was reportedly in complete disarray and looked as though something had happened.

Later, McCrea's acquaintances were brought into questioning. One of them, Gemma Louise Ramsbottom, a former secretary of McCrea, told police that when she arrived at the apartment on McCrea's request, she was shocked to see Kho lying dead in the living room and McCrea, who appeared injured, using a knife to threaten her to not reveal the gruesome finding, as well as forcing her to help him dispose of the bodies and the victims' belongings. Another man, Augustine Justin Cheo Yi Tang, also told police that McCrea and Ong sought his help to provide them acid to dissolve the bodies and cleaning fluid to clean up the flat. In both cases, Ramsbottom and Cheo received word from McCrea that he did not mean to kill Kho and Lan, as it was due to a fight that ended fatally.

As such, both Michael McCrea and Audrey Ong were placed on the police's wanted list for their alleged involvement in the deaths of Kho and Lan, which were classified as murder. Interpol also received and approved Singapore's request to set out an international fugitive notice for both McCrea and Ong. Five months later, the two were arrested by the local authorities in Melbourne, Australia, where they sought refuge from the home of McCrea's then estranged pregnant wife after spending some time hiding in London.

== Michael McCrea ==
Michael McCrea
- Born: c. 1958; United Kingdom
- Other name: Mike Townsend
- Status: Released on parole since 29 June 2022
- Convictions: two counts of culpable homicide not amounting to murder; 1 count of causing evidence to disappear
- Penalty: 24 years' imprisonment (29 June 2006)
- Accomplice: Audrey Ong Pei Ling (12 years' imprisonment)

Details
- Victims: 2
- Date: 2–4 January 2002
- Country: Singapore
- Date apprehended: 21 June 2002 (Australia); 28 September 2005 (Singapore)

Michael McCrea, born in Britain in 1958, was a school drop-out who did not complete his secondary school education and left school without an O-level exam certificate. He did, however, possess a talent in business, and he became publicly acknowledged in the media for his business savvy. McCrea was also recognised as "Nottingham's Million Pound Man" in 1980 after he was able to earn a profit of £1.2 million in nine months on behalf of a financial-services firm he was employed at. McCrea went to South East Asia in the 1990s, and worked as a financial adviser in Singapore, the same country where he first met and married his Australian wife Brunetta Stocco, with whom he had four children, including a son named Callum (aged two in 2003). Their marriage reportedly ended, according to Stocco, when he came to her house in Australia with Ong.

Under the alias Mike Townsend, McCrea wrote and published a book titled Expat Survival Kit, which gave advice to his expatriate clients about financial strategies in business. He was reported to have violated financial regulations and fined for his misconduct in Singapore at one point. McCrea, who rented an apartment at Pinewood Gardens Condominium in Balmoral Park, was said to have a lifestyle of throwing noisy parties near the pool of the condominium, which often drew complaints and annoyance from his neighbours. McCrea's wife also left him to live in Australia due to her disliking her husband's lifestyle. McCrea also learned amateur boxing at one point in his lifetime. He became engaged in a romantic relationship with pub waitress Audrey Ong, whom he first met through a friend at a pub in June 2001 and later lived with him.

In 1998, McCrea first met Kho Nai Guan, a taxi driver whom he formed a close friendship with and later hired as his personal driver six months after they met. Kho was formerly an electronics business owner whose business went bankrupt after a few years of operation in 1989, before his employment at his brother's pet-food business and his failed venture to establish his own business in 1992. Kho was known to be a friendly and well-spoken individual to his friends and his excellent services as a taxi driver gave him commendation and awards in 1997. Kho moved into McCrea's home in 1999 after he became estranged from his wife, and he later lived together with his girlfriend Lan Ya Ming. Kho was also known to be philandering and often spent nights with foreign women and prostitutes. Still, it did not affect his brotherly relationship with McCrea, who often affectionately called him "Ah Guan" and paid him decently for his job.

== The defendants' account ==
The following account below was what happened to Kho Nai Guan and Lan Ya Ming, according to Michael McCrea and Audrey Ong after their arrests and trials. According to the duo, it resulted from Kho allegedly calling Ong "jian huo", which was a Chinese derogatory term that means "slut" when translated to English, and this provoked McCrea in fighting and killing Kho in the process; Lan was later killed in the aftermath of the fight. Initially, McCrea claimed it was due to Kho stealing his cash to buy drugs, which sparked a fight between them both and ended with Kho's death.

It was after midnight on 2 January 2002 when McCrea gathered with Ong, Lan and Kho to drink champagne to celebrate the New Year's Day from the day before. During the session, Kho spat at Ong and called her a slut in Chinese. For this, McCrea was angered and confronted Kho. Kho, who got pushed against the wall and punched on the face, retaliated by breaking a vase on his employer's head, but it only led to McCrea kicking him, fracturing his ribs before he held him in an armlock to punch him repeatedly. During the fight, McCrea used too much strength and it led to fractures in the bones around the throat, leading to 46-year-old Kho Nai Guan to die from strangulation.

Lan tried to attack McCrea with a knife but she was knocked unconscious by McCrea, and brought into Kho's bedroom. It was at 4.30 am when McCrea realised Kho had died, after seeing that his body was cold and his legs turned purple. He and Ong tried to resuscitate Kho with CPR but their efforts were fruitless. McCrea spent the next two days frantically trying to cover up Kho's death by gathering Kho's belongings for disposal, and also enlisted the help of both Gemma Ramsbottom and Augustine Justin Cheo during this period. Lan Ya Ming, who was locked in Kho's bedroom and fed some water, chocolate and cranberry juice, was pressured into revealing the whereabouts of Kho's cash, including the $20,000 bonus McCrea paid to Kho a month prior.

The wicker basket where McCrea and Ong concealed Kho Nai Guan's corpse and belongings.

On 4 January 2002, after stuffing Kho's body and belongings into the wicker basket, McCrea tied three plastic bags over the unconscious Lan's head, and tightened each layer of plastic bag around Lan's neck with his personal necktie. 29-year-old Lan Ya Ming, who was still alive at the time, later suffocated due to strangulation by the neck and died. It was mentioned that Lan struggled and convulsed as McCrea tightly wrapped her head with plastic bags. McCrea also wrapped up Lan's whole body with blankets and plastic strings before he and Ong placed the bodies of Lan and Kho into Kho's car and drove it to a carpark at Orchard Towers where they abandoned it. Afterwards, they left for London the next day after obtaining air tickets for their destination.

== Court proceedings ==
=== Extradition and trial of Audrey Ong ===
After Audrey Ong and Michael McCrea were arrested in Melbourne, Australia, the Singaporean authorities were notified and they thus issued extradition orders for both McCrea and Ong to stand trial in Singapore.

Ong was the first to be extradited and arrived in Singapore on 10 November 2002. She pleaded guilty to two charges of causing evidence of a capital offence to disappear, and on 8 February 2003, Ong was sentenced to a total of 12 years' imprisonment, which consisted of two consecutive terms of six years, to which each term was applied to each charge. Despite Ong's lawyer Jeffrey Soh's plea for leniency on account of his client's voluntary surrender and willingness to testify against McCrea, District Judge Richard Magnus did not buy Ong's mitigation plea as he found her demonstrating an utter lack of remorse and having made no attempt to contact the authorities after the murders occurred. He also described her overall conduct as "sordid, macabre, callous, shocking, reprehensible and grossly offensive" in societal standing. Ong later declined to continue her appeal against her sentence despite filing it on 14 May 2003.

=== Extradition of Michael McCrea ===
However, even though he was arrested together with Ong and an extradition order from Singapore was issued for him, McCrea was not extradited and remained in a maximum-security Australian prison as it is against Australian law to extradite anyone to another jurisdiction if he or she could face the death sentence, especially since Australia completely abolished capital punishment in 1985. Given that the charges McCrea was wanted for were capital murder, McCrea would be sentenced to death under Singapore law if found guilty of murder. For this, the Singapore government decided to make a bargain: they gave the Australian government the assurance that McCrea would not be hanged even if he was convicted of murder. The assurance, according to experts, was possible to be fulfilled even if McCrea was found guilty and sentenced to death by the courts, as he would be entitled to appeal to the higher courts of Singapore to reduce his sentence, and further on, if the appeal fails, McCrea would still be given a chance to appeal to the President of Singapore for clemency, which will commute his death sentence to life imprisonment if successful. This assurance eventually allowed Australia to approve the extradition on 16 November 2002.

However, McCrea initiated a series of legal proceedings to fight against the extradition order, and it took more than three years before finally, his fourth and last appeal was rejected by the High Court of Australia after the first three appeals failed. McCrea was thus kept in a straitjacket for two weeks after the final rejection, to stop him from harming himself. He was brought back to Singapore by flight on 27 September 2005, where he was officially charged with two counts of murder in the Subordinate Courts of Singapore. He was remanded for psychiatric evaluation in October 2005 after some investigations and was set to stand trial on a later date.

A Law Ministry spokesman said at the time with regards to the bargaining in the extradition of McCrea: "Without the undertaking, extraditing McCrea and bringing him to justice is not possible. We will then have a situation where an accused will completely escape trial in Singapore or elsewhere."

=== Michael McCrea's trial and sentence ===
==== Guilty plea and submissions ====
On 25 June 2006, nine months after he was extradited back to Singapore, 48-year-old Michael McCrea was brought to trial in the High Court for killing Kho Nai Guan and Lan Ya Ming. By then, after McCrea's defence lawyer Kelvin Lim made some representations to the prosecution and some pre-trial conferences, the prosecution agreed to reduce the murder charges to lesser offences of culpable homicide not amounting to murder, which were not punishable by death. The reduction was done not out of the agreement with the Australian government, as the agreement was centered around the reassurance to not hang McCrea even if he was found guilty of murder, but rather from the prosecution's review of its case against McCrea.

Not only that, the prosecution also brought up a third charge of causing evidence to disappear against McCrea, who expressed his intention to plead guilty to the reduced criminal charges, as well as the fresh charge proceeding against him. The reduction of the original charges meant that McCrea would not be sentenced to death even if found guilty. McCrea's two culpable homicide charges were second-degree and lacked the intention to kill by nature under Section 304(b) of the Penal Code, the maximum penalty for each charge was ten years' imprisonment, in addition to a possible fine.

In his mitigation, Michael McCrea pleaded for a lenient sentence, as he was psychologically haunted by his own conscience and felt remorse for his reprehensible actions. He stated that he and Kho shared a brotherly friendship since they first met in 1998. McCrea also raised out his own emotions and frequent concern for Kho's welfare, which lasted up till the day he killed Kho during their fight, when he asked Kho to go to bed after hearing he was not feeling well from taking drugs during their drinks session prior to Kho's alleged insulting of Ong. The lawyer also asked that McCrea be given a lighter penalty given that the deaths were resultant of a sudden fight and McCrea's exercising of his self-defence, and there was no intention to cause the deaths of Kho and Lan that fateful night, and that McCrea tried to revive Kho upon finding that his heartbeat has stopped.

In rebuttal, the prosecution, led by Deputy Public Prosecutors (DPP) Christopher Ong and Wong Kok Weng, asked the court to take into consideration the aggravating factors of the case. Firstly, McCrea's assault of Kho was totally disproportionate to the provocation that arise from Kho's insult of Ong and for this small matter, Kho was being assaulted grievously to the point of injury and death; Kho's smashing of the vase on McCrea's head was merely a response to McCrea's physical confrontation and aggressiveness shown to Kho upon receiving word from Ong that Kho insulted her. For Lan, she was merely at the wrong place at the wrong time during Kho's assault and she was being confined and locked up for witnessing Kho's death. She was completely at McCrea's mercy when she was being wrapped up in cloth and plastic but none were shown by McCrea, and she was still alive at the time the plastic bags were tied around her, causing her to suffocate to death. Also, they pointed out that rather than admitting to his crimes and contacting the authorities, McCrea only cared about covering up his acts and looking for the bonus he paid Kho prior to his death, and even fled the country to escape punishment. For this, the prosecution urged the court to mete out a stiff penalty for McCrea for the Orchard Towers double killings.

==== Verdict ====
Four days later, on 29 June 2006, High Court judge Choo Han Teck sentenced McCrea to a total of 24 years' imprisonment. He first imposed the maximum ten-year term of imprisonment for each of the two culpable homicide charges for both Kho's and Lan's deaths and a third consecutive term of four years' imprisonment for causing the evidence of the killings to disappear. Justice Choo stated that he did not buy the fact that McCrea was remorseful of his actions, as he did not choose to surrender and face the consequences of his actions and even flew out of Singapore before the discovery of his crimes and before the authorities could apprehend him. He also stated that McCrea had extensively battered Kho and caused his death over a relatively simple, small matter. Lan's death was a result of McCrea trying to prevent her from leaving the flat, and kicked her in the head before killing her, all because he wanted to find Kho's money in the aftermath of Kho's killing.

For this, McCrea deserved the highest punishment the court could give for his first two charges of culpable homicide, and these first two terms were to be served consecutively in view of the separate, distinct nature of the two offences. With regards to McCrea's third consecutive term of four years over the disappearance of evidence, Justice Choo noted that it was lower than the six years Audrey Ong received for each charge of the same crime McCrea was convicted of despite his more principal role in covering up the crimes, but he stated that McCrea faced more serious charges relating to offences affecting life unlike Ong, which made it reasonable should the penalty for this third crime in McCrea's case was lesser than Ong.

When responding to the defence's request to backdate McCrea's 24-year sentence to the date of his arrest in Australia four years earlier (or at least to the date of his first day of remand in Singapore after his extradition), Justice Choo stated that he, as a judge, should be taking into consideration the facts of the case before he can exercise his powers of discretion to backdate the jail term. He laid out that for the approximate first three years, McCrea spent them behind bars in Australia while he was fighting tooth and nail against his extradition order, and hence it did not make sense and would be "invidious" for McCrea to serve his sentence four years less in Singapore. Since there were no significant mitigating factors other than his lack of criminal records for violent offences, Justice Choo said there was no reason for him to backdate McCrea's sentence to any of the dates requested by Lim.

According to Kelvin Lim, his 48-year-old client was stunned and shocked to hear that his sentence was only effective from the day of his sentencing, and personally to McCrea, the 24-year jail term was quite a "crushing" sentence. Some members of the public, including one who wrote a letter to The Straits Times (a national daily newspaper in Singapore), felt that McCrea's punishment was too light for him.

=== Michael McCrea's appeal and outcome ===
Michael McCrea appealed to the Court of Appeal of Singapore for a lighter sentence. However, the three-judge panel, consisting of Chief Justice Yong Pung How, High Court judge V K Rajah and Judge of Appeal Andrew Phang, were not convinced that McCrea was remorseful of his crimes and thus refused to reduce the sentence. Rather, the three-judge panel nearly considered increasing the jail term, which by maximum, could be raised to three years longer than the original term, as the charge of causing evidence to disappear carried the maximum penalty of seven years in prison (three years more than the four years McCrea received for this offence). Still, the Court of Appeal elected to not do so due to the lack of merit in the appeal, and hence McCrea escaped the worst possibility of serving a total of 27 years in jail.

When Lim argued for a concurrent ten-year sentence during the appeal hearing (which will possibly allow McCrea to serve 14 years' jail), one of the judges - Justice Andrew Phang - issued strong words against him for asking for two concurrent jail terms when the case involved two lives being lost. When Lim also raised the fact that McCrea tried to revive Kho, Justice Phang asked Lim, "Your best friend, your brother, is dying. Put yourself in your client's position. What would you have done?" Lim replied, "I would call an ambulance." At this reply, Justice Phang immediately shot back, "Yes. It's common humanity." As such, the appeal ended with dismissal on 23 August 2006.

If he maintained good behaviour behind bars, McCrea would be granted a one-third remission of his 24-year sentence and he would be tentatively released on 29 June 2022 after serving at least 16 years of imprisonment behind bars. By then, McCrea would be 64 years old at the time of his early release.

== Aftermath ==
Crime documentary series True Files re-enacted the case. The sixth episode of the show's fifth and final season, which featured the murder and trials of the murderers, first aired on 11 February 2007. The episode is currently available in meWATCH. McCrea's lawyer Kelvin Lim was interviewed in the episode about the case.

The Orchard Towers double murder case was considered a notable crime that shook Singapore. In July 2015, Singapore's national daily newspaper The Straits Times published an e-book titled Guilty As Charged: 25 Crimes That Have Shaken Singapore Since 1965, which included the 2002 Orchard Towers double killings as one of the top 25 crimes that shocked the nation since its independence in 1965. The book was borne out of collaboration between the Singapore Police Force and the newspaper itself. The e-book was edited by ST News Associate editor Abdul Hafiz bin Abdul Samad. The paperback edition of the book was published and first hit bookshelves in June 2017. The paperback edition first entered the ST bestseller list on 8 August 2017, a month after publication.

Also, the case of McCrea's extradition became a precedent case where the Government of Singapore could negotiate for the extradition of suspects from other countries that did not practice capital punishment or caning etc. The Orchard Towers double murder and McCrea's extradition case were recalled when in 2018, the Government of Singapore sent a request to the United Kingdom, which abolished caning for all crimes in 1948, to extradite David James Roach, a Canadian bank robber who robbed a bank in Singapore, on the assurance that Roach would not be caned even if he was found guilty of robbery, a crime which warrants mandatory caning in addition to imprisonment in Singapore. Roach had fled to Thailand after committing the crime in July 2016, and he spent 14 months in a Thai prison for violation of currency regulations and money laundering before he was caught in London upon Singapore's request for his capture. The assurance for Roach to not be caned allowed the British government to send Roach back to Singapore for trial in 2020; Roach was sentenced to serve a five-year term of imprisonment and an additional six strokes of the cane in July 2021, and the caning was cancelled after President Halimah Yacob granted Roach clemency shortly after his sentencing.

The Orchard Towers double homicide case was not the only case that associated the Orchard Towers with murder. 17 years after the deaths of Kho Nai Guan and Lan Ya Ming, in July 2019, a 31-year-old chemist named Satheesh Noel Gobidass was killed during a fight. Seven suspects were arrested and charged, but six were sentenced to serve jail terms ranging from a few months to less than five years for lower charges, while the final member Tan Sen Yang was given a life sentence with caning for murder.

== See also ==
- Capital punishment in Singapore
- List of major crimes in Singapore
- 2019 Orchard Towers murder
- Orchard Towers murders (disambiguation)
