= 2010 Downtown East slashing =

2010 gang-related murder in Singapore

- Location: Downtown East, Singapore
- Date: 30 October 2010; 16 years ago
- Victim: Darren Ng Wei Jie
- Perpetrators: Stilwell Ong Keat Pin, 18 (gang leader); Ho Wui Ming, 20; Chen Wei Zhen, 19; Edward Tay Wei Loong, 18; Louis Tong Qing Yao, 16; Chong Rui Hong, 18; Tang Jia Min, 21; Puay De Feng, 19; Jason Chew Wei Beng, 19; Lewis Wee Jun Jie, 20; Ho Wei Quan, 17; Ng Wei Lun, 18
- Motive: gang conflict
- Charges: murder rioting
- Convictions: culpable homicide rioting

On 30 October 2010, at Downtown East, Singapore, 19-year-old Darren Ng Wei Jie (黄伟杰; Huáng Wěijié), a Singaporean student from Republic Polytechnic, was slashed by 12 youths from a rival gang after a staring incident between one of Ng's friends and one of these youths attacking him. Ng suffered from 28 knife wounds and died in Changi General Hospital five hours after the incident. The case was classified as murder, and the police arrested all the suspects. Six of them were charged with murder, but all except one were sentenced to serve lengthy jail terms with caning for culpable homicide (the sixth was instead found guilty of rioting), while the others were sentenced to varied jail terms and caning for rioting.

== Crime ==
=== Fatal gang fight ===
On 30 October 2010, a previous conflict between the leaders of two rival gangs, 21-year-old Dickson Ng Teck Seng of Fong Hong San (Phoenix Hill) and 18-year-old Stilwell Ong Keat Pin (王吉宾; Wáng Jíbīn) of Salakau (or gang 369), led to the two deciding to meet at Downtown East for a 1-on-1 fight. Ong brought along 11 other youths to meet up with Dickson Ng and armed themselves with knives and other weapons; however, Dickson Ng did not show up, instead sending a few of his gang members in his place. One of them was 19-year-old student Darren Ng Wei Jie (unrelated to Dickson Ng), a second-year industrial and operations management student from Republic Polytechnic. One of them had a tense conversation with Ong, and one of Ng's friends stared at one of Ong's friends. The situation escalated when Ong brandished a chilli sauce bottle but accidentally dropped it. Ng perceived it as a hostile move and whipped out a baton for self-defence, which led to Ong and his gang attacking Ng and his friends.

Outnumbered, Ng and his friends fled the scene and Ong's gang gave chase, passing many witnesses and some crowded shops in Downtown East Mall. After running some distance, Ng crashed into a glass door outside Sakura International Buffet Restaurant and before he could recover, Ong's gang caught up. Upon catching Ng, they used screwdrivers, choppers and knives to stab and slash him. There were many witnesses, including some young children, who were horrified by the violence.

Eventually, the gang left, leaving Ng in a pool of blood outside Sakura. He had a total of 28 slash wounds on his body, mostly on his left limbs and below his right rib cage. One of Ng's friends returned to tend to him while they waited for an ambulance; Ng was soon brought to Changi General Hospital for emergency treatment. Five hours after the incident, at about 10:55 pm on the night of 30 October 2010, Darren Ng was pronounced dead. The recorded cause of Ng's death was a fatal stab wound to his neck which caused massive bleeding.

=== Funeral and reactions to death ===
Given the fact that the incident occurred in a Saturday evening, in front of a large crowd consisting of people of all ages, the feelings of the public had run high and the pro-death penalty advocates voiced out for the hanging of the main culprits for their part in the murder of the young student. This fact had also reinforced the blatant disregard the offenders had for the law. The government stepped in to implement guidance programmes to reach out for those at-risk young people and teenagers who were vulnerable to joining gangs. The violence by the gang killing also sent ripples among the emotions of the public.

On 3 November 2010, Darren Ng's funeral was held. It was attended by hundreds of family members and friends, which included Ng's parents and elder sister.

In an article reporting Ng's funeral and memorial service, Ng was described as a "cheerful" young man with "a heart of gold" by those who know him. It was reported that during his secondary school years, there would be weekly phone calls made by Ng's teachers to his parents, indicating Ng as a rebellious student.

Ng's father, Francis Ng, however, said that when his son was dismissed from the polytechnic three weeks prior to his death, Ng wrote an appeal letter by himself; knowing this, the bereaved father knew that his son has grown up and wanted to quit his rebellious ways. He said at the memorial service that his son died because of his "love for his friends".

Darren Ng's elder sister, Debbie, described her brother as a "little older brother" to her, saying that although he always made his family worry about him, they knew that he dearly loved them. She said, "Jie Jie (a Chinese term for "elder sister") misses you".

Ng's then girlfriend said that her boyfriend, whom she dated for seven months prior to his death, used to always talk about his friends and family, and was a "joker" who would always make those around him laugh. One of Ng's childhood friends said of his friend as one who always wanted "the best for his friends".

In addition, Ng's friends from the secret society gang which Ng associated with also attended the funeral. When seeing reporters at the scene, some of them turned aggressive and confronted them for not giving any peace to Ng's bereaved family, threatening them with fists, covering their cameras or raising their voices, which disrupted the originally peaceful and quiet funeral.

In 2011, Marvin Ng, a childhood friend and next-door neighbour of Darren Ng, revealed in an interview that he knew Ng since five years old and studied in the same primary school (Rosyth School) as him. Marvin stated that at the time of Ng's death, he was in preparation for his GCE A-levels, which was a week away. He said that he was sad to hear that Ng died from the grievous assault at Downtown East and when he attended Ng's funeral, he could not bring himself to continue to study for his national exams. However, the then-19-year-old Millennia Institute student said that despite his grief, he was grateful for his family and Ng's parents, who supported him throughout the tragic period and his exam period and finally, he attained three 'A's for his A-level results.

== Arrests and charges ==
After the incident, the police first arrested four of the youths involved; one of them resisted arrest and while making his escape, he accidentally suffered from a head injury and had to be hospitalised. Three of these arrested youths—Tang Jia Min, 21; Ho Wui Ming (何为民; Hé Weìmín), 20 and Chen Wei Zhen (陈伟振; Chén Weǐzhèn), 19—were charged with murder. The fourth youth who resisted arrest and was hospitalised, 18-year-old Edward Tay Wei Loong (郑伟龙; Zhèng Weǐlóng), was placed under arrest in the hospital and charged with murder. The other eight youths were also eventually arrested and charged—two with murder and six with rioting—for their part in the attack on Darren Ng. Stilwell Ong was one of those two people facing the murder charge, the other was 16-year-old Louis Tong Qing Yao (董清耀; Dǒng Qīngyào), a bespectacled secondary school student who also faced charges of loan shark harassment. Tang Jia Min, one of those youths charged with murder, eventually had his charge reduced to rioting, while the other five accused of murder, identified to be the main attackers of Ng, still had their charges of murder against them.

As the offence of murder under Singapore law warrants a mandatory death sentence, if they were found guilty, these people, except for 16-year-old Louis Tong, will be sentenced to death. Should he be found guilty and convicted of murder, Louis Tong will instead be sentenced to life imprisonment, since he was under 18 years old at the time of the crime and thus he cannot be hanged (under Singapore law, offenders convicted of murder, drug trafficking or other capital offences will not be sentenced to death if they were under 18 years old at the time of the offences. Instead, they would be sentenced to life imprisonment or indefinite detention).

=== Sentences of those charged with rioting ===
The first gang member to be sentenced was 19-year-old Jason Chew Wei Beng. He was brought to court nearly a year and a half after the incident, where he pleaded guilty to rioting, and another offence of causing hurt to a 20-year-old man at Bishan Bus Interchange in April 2010. On 7 March 2012, Chew was sentenced to 4 years' imprisonment, and given 6 strokes of the cane. Two months later, Chew's fellow gang member Puay De Feng was sentenced to a total of 5 years' imprisonment after pleading guilty to rioting and an unrelated crime of voluntarily causing hurt to a Korean national named Yoon Sang-jun at St James Power Station, in which his sentences are ordered to run consecutively (4 years and 9 months for rioting and 3 months for voluntarily causing hurt). Puay, who was 19 at the time of the Downtown East incident, was also given 6 strokes of the cane.

On 19 July 2012, four more youths were convicted of rioting and sentenced on the same date. Tang Jia Min, who initially faced a murder charge like the five main culprits, received the heaviest sentence of 6 years and 3 months' imprisonment and 6 strokes of the cane for playing a more instrumental role in the crime. Nineteen-year-old Ho Wei Quan was sentenced to 5 years' imprisonment and 6 strokes of the cane. Twenty-two-year-old Lewis Wee Jun Jie was sentenced to 4 years and 10 months' imprisonment and 6 strokes of the cane. Twenty-year-old Chong Rui Hong received the lightest sentence out of the four—4 years' imprisonment and 3 strokes of the cane.

On 24 September 2012, the seventh youth Ng Wei Lun, aged 20, was sentenced to 3 years and 3 months' imprisonment and 3 strokes of the cane, a sentence comparatively lighter than that of Chong Rui Hong. Ng Wei Lun was the last gang member to be dealt with after all his friends, as his date of sentencing was more than two weeks after the sentencing of the five main culprits for their major roles in the death of Darren Ng Wei Jie.

== Trial of the five main culprits ==
Eventually, on 30 July 2012, the five youths—Stilwell Ong Keat Pin, Chen Wei Zhen, Ho Wui Ming, Louis Tong Qing Yao, and Edward Tay Wei Loong—saw their charges reduced to a lesser charge of culpable homicide not amounting to murder, which meant that they would not face the death sentence, but either life imprisonment or up to 20 years in jail with caning. All five youths, who were represented by veteran lawyer Subhas Anandan, pleaded guilty to the reduced charges as they stood trial before Justice Tay Yong Kwang of the High Court of Singapore. Additionally, Tong admitted to a few charges of loan shark harassment and Ho also submitted a plea of guilty to two unrelated charges of theft and mischief.

The mitigation plea and sentencing was postponed due to Subhas having to go on medical leave in midst of the closing submissions due to poor health. In their closing submissions, the prosecution had urged for a sentence of at least 15 years' imprisonment and 12 strokes of the cane for Ong, who was not the oldest but the leader of the gang and mastermind of the attack on Darren Ng. The prosecution also asked for a sentence of between 12 and 15 years' imprisonment and 10 strokes of the cane each for the other four.

In mitigation, Subhas Anandan, who returned from his sick leave, argued that the courts should show some leniency to the boys in view of their young age and give them a chance of rehabilitation. He acknowledged that the boys deserved whatever consequences they have to face for such a heinous and violent act, given that a life had been lost as a result. However, he argued that the tragedy will only be augmented if young offenders like the five young defendants were being sentenced to long periods of incarceration behind bars, which will also destroy their lives like how Ng's life had been destroyed by the boys themselves, and doing so will not be able to bring back the life that has already been lost.

On 8 September 2012, nearly two years after the untimely death of 19-year-old Darren Ng, Stilwell Ong, who used a chopper to slash the victim, was sentenced to 12 years' imprisonment and 12 strokes of the cane, the heaviest sentence meted out among the five. Ho Wui Ming, who used a screwdriver to cause hurt to Ng, was sentenced to a total of 11 years and 3 months' imprisonment with 10 strokes of the cane. Both Chen Wei Zhen and Edward Tay each received a sentence of 10 years' imprisonment and 10 strokes of the cane for using a fruit knife and chopper, respectively. As for Louis Tong, who was armed with a fruit knife at the time of the attack, he was sentenced to 8 years' imprisonment and 11 strokes of the cane for the crimes he committed.

During sentencing, Justice Tay reportedly said that it was as heartbreaking for the court as it must have been for the parents watching the proceedings. He said in court as he passed the sentences on the five youths, "I can only implore especially on behalf of all parents, young persons in secret societies and street gangs to open their eyes to the tragic truth that violence begets violence and vicious acts only breed more vicious reactions." The five youths decided to not appeal against their sentences.

== Aftermath ==
=== Fates of Darren Ng's family and friends ===
Ng's father Francis Ng (aged 53 in 2014) and mother Joyce Tan (aged 51 in 2014), began to slowly open up to Ng's friends from the gang, with whom they were originally angry at and partially blamed for their son's death. After they opened up and shared their grief, they began to slowly understand Ng's friends and stopped their judgemental attitude towards these delinquent youths. As for Ng's friends, they began to regard Ng's parents as their godparents, as to them, the couple gave them the parental attention they craved, and was willing to listen to their thoughts, which they did not share with even their own parents.

After moving into a new apartment, Ng's family converted a room, originally meant for Ng before his untimely death, into an entertainment centre for Ng's friends to gather and enjoy some activities. They also occasionally give advice to, or bring these young people out for meals or a movie. Gradually, from seven of Ng's friends, the group eventually consisted of more than 30 troubled youths, including the friends of Ng's acquaintances. Some were from broken families, while others are from good families, but they got along very well. One of Ng's close friends, who asked not to be named, reportedly said, "They filled the need for us to be loved and be cared for. They are very generous and kind. Godpa even paid for a degree course for one of my friends."

Ng's death also became a wake-up call for some of the youths especially, "It could have happened to me or any one of my friends," said another unnamed youth. "I saw how his family struggled with the crisis. Me and the other boys, we tried our best to be with Godma. She sees Darren in us. That really allowed the beginning of the healing process." Ng's mother, who slowly come to love the youths like how she loved her son and treat them as her own, additionally said that it is hard to not have expectations on these youths, for one instance, when some of them promised her to stop smoking, it was disheartening when they did not fulfill that promise and continue to smoke. Ng's father also reportedly hosted a golf tournament together with a friend to raise funds for the troubled youth; he stated that he had lost his son and did not want to let other parents losing theirs.

An unnamed friend of Darren Ng, who happened to be one of those together with Ng prior to the attack and witnessed the attack, stated that the death of his best friend changed his life drastically, leading him to turn over a new leaf and work hard to live a normal life and support his family, whom he cherished and would spend more time with. He stated that till this day, he had not gotten over the death of Ng, and still kept photos of him in his phone. The friend expressed his wish to help Ng's family to cope with their grief and take care of them but he did not want them to feel sad as seeing them will remind them of what happened that day.

=== Fates of Darren Ng's twelve killers ===
As for the 12 youths who attacked Ng at Downtown East, one of these youths, Chong Rui Hong, whose 4-year imprisonment sentence was backdated to the time of his remand in November 2010, was released in July 2013 after serving at least two-thirds of his sentence (2 years and 8 months) with good behaviour. Chong, who was 18 at the time of the incident, and now working as a popcorn seller, told the newspaper The Sunday Times in a phone interview in February 2014 that he was determined to start his life afresh. The incident made him reflect on his past while in prison and he decided to turn over a new leaf and strive for a future he wanted for himself. Chong was also studying part-time and planning to retake his GCE O-levels and get into a polytechnic for a brighter future.

Another of these youths, Ng Wei Lun, who grew up in a single-parent family with a few other siblings and joined the gang at age 14, stated that he felt remorse over the death of Darren Ng, regretting his decision to follow his gang into Downtown East that fateful day and making his single father disappointed in him. Ng, who spent 10 months in remand and was on bail when he was interviewed by the paper before he started to serve his prison sentence of 3 years and 3 months (which he received for rioting, along with 3 strokes of the cane), stated that seeing his lorry driver father (who had to work seven days a week to pay the legal fees to his son's lawyer Josephus Tan) coping with his foolish acts, he could feel the pain Darren Ng's parents felt at the loss of their son, which made him realise his father's suffering. He even tried to do some housework to lighten his father's burden while spending his last days of freedom before serving his sentence. Ng Wei Lun's then-18-year-old girlfriend noted her boyfriend's change in behaviour and him increasingly caring over his family.

In December 2018, eight years after his arrest, Stilwell Ong, the mastermind of the 2010 gang attack, was released from prison on parole due to good behaviour. However, Ong reoffended and he returned to court, this time on a charge of cheating by impersonation, which he committed on 11 October 2019, when he allegedly impersonated someone else in order to have a car delivered to him. He also faced charges of traffic and drug-related offences. Two years later, on 18 March 2022, 30-year-old Ong was sentenced to a jail term of two years, two months and four weeks. Ong was also given a fine of $8,200 and six strokes of the cane. As Ong could not pay the fine, he had an additional period of 41 days added to his jail term. He was given a 12-month driving ban.

=== Re-enactment ===
The case of Darren Ng was re-enacted into a real-life crime documentary by Channel NewsAsia titled Crimson. The facts of the case was narrated by David Artlett. Subhas Anandan, the lawyer who represented the main five accused of the case, appeared on screen to be interviewed. The documentary was available on YouTube since 2019.

The events of the Downtown East Slashing were mentioned in the first episode of On The Fringe.

== Preferential treatment controversy of the Orchard Towers murder case ==
The case of Darren Ng was recalled in a controversy that involved another murder case.

The facts of the case were that on the fateful day of 2 July 2019, a group of seven people in their twenties were involved in a physical brawl with 31-year-old Satheesh Noel Gobidass at Orchard Towers, and Satheesh was killed during the fight. The group of seven people were all arrested and charged with murder. However, by November 2020, six of the members saw their murder charges reduced while the seventh and last member, 28-year-old Tan Sen Yang, was the sole attacker left shouldering the murder charge and was set to stand trial in the High Court of Singapore on a later date. Tan Sen Yang was said to be armed with a karambit knife and used it to stab at the victim's head and neck multiple times resulting in the man's death. The case was dubbed the "Orchard Towers murder" in local media.

As for the other six members, one of them - 27-year-old Chan Jia Xing - who was investigated to be trying to stop the fight and was not involved in the fight and fully cooperated with the police after his arrest, was set free after he received a 12-month conditional warning for a lesser charge of consorting with a person carrying an offensive weapon in a public place, which meant no conviction or sentence, but if Chan ever re-offend within the next 12-month period, he would return to court. The rest of the five - Joel Tan Yun Sheng, Ang Da Yuan, Natalie Siow Yu Zhen, Loo Boon Chong and Tan Hong Sheng - were sentenced to jail terms between one month and four years and nine months for charges of consorting Tan Sen Yang, as well as rioting, assault, obstruction of justice and other unrelated offences; both Ang and Tan Hong Sheng were caned six and 12 strokes of the cane respectively.

As a result of the reduction of the murder charges against all except Tan Sen Yang, two female netizens in social media made up and circulated posts containing allegations of preferential treatment in sentencing on account of race of alleged criminals, saying that minority people are given harsher sentences while the majority races escaped with lighter charges and penalties. The women were immediately arrested days after the controversy. In response to such allegations, the Attorney-General's Chambers (AGC) said such media posts have the "potential to disrupt racial harmony in Singapore, and cause irreversible divisions in our communities" and amount to contempt of court, in addition to refuting these allegatory claims. Three days after the arrest of the two women for the preferential treatment allegations, Minister of State for Home Affairs Muhammad Faishal Ibrahim called these claims baseless and irresponsible while in a Parliament session. He said everyone are entitled to fair and equal treatment under the law. Faishal told the House that where there are several suspects allegedly involved in the same capital case (like murder or kidnapping), all of them will face the same charge together initially, and these people will be detained in remand pending further investigations and after looking through the facts of the case, it will be decided whether to proceed with the capital charge or reduce it or withdraw it. Faishal said that the positions made against the people involved in the case would differ based on the evidence available and his/her role in the matter.

To support his case, Faishal cited the 2010 murder of 19-year-old Darren Ng Wei Jie and the 12-member gang attack from 10 years ago, in which all the 12 gang members initially faced the murder charges before it ultimately ended into seven people convicted of rioting while the other five convicted of the most serious charges of culpable homicide not amounting to murder. Once again, before ending off, Faishal reiterated that everyone, regardless of race, religion, socio-economic status or educational achievements, are not subject to any preferential treatment by the criminal justice system of Singapore.

In the aftermath of the controversy, Tan Sen Yang was sentenced to life in prison (in addition to caning) for murder in April 2024. The two women who first started the controversy were also pending trial as of August 2021.

== See also ==
- Murder of Sulaiman bin Hashim
- Capital punishment in Singapore
