= Orchard Towers murders =

The Orchard Towers murders, which consisted of murder cases that occurred at Orchard Towers in Singapore, may refer to:

- Orchard Towers double murders (2002), where a couple was murdered by British expatriate Michael McCrea
- 2019 Orchard Towers murder, where Singaporean Satheesh Noel Gobidass was killed during a fight with a group of seven people
