= Sangeetha Thanapal =

Singaporean activist

Sangeetha Thanapal (born c. 1983) is a Singaporean social critic and political activist. She came to prominence as the creator of the term "Chinese Privilege," a term analogous to "White Privilege." She was an Activist-In-Residence at Massey University from February 27th to March 1st, 2019, focusing on the theme of Anti-Racist Interventions.

== Political views ==
Thanapal has written prolifically on race relations in Singapore. She uses the term "Chinese privilege" to describe perceived Chinese hegemony in Singapore, defining it "similarly to white privilege". According to Thanapal, "By virtue of being Chinese in Singapore, you start life at a higher place compared to minorities."

In August 2015, she wrote on Facebook that Minister for Law and Foreign Affairs K. Shanmugam was an "Islamophobic bigot who thinks Malay-Muslims are a threat"; she later apologised to Shanmugam for her "unruly" remarks and took down her post.

In January 2019, the Singapore police issued her a stern warning for "promoting enmity between different groups on grounds of religion or race" under Section 298A of the country's penal code.

In 2021, she tweeted that the Chinese are the "White people of Asia".

Her article criticizing the movie Crazy Rich Asians went viral, leading to interviews with the New York Times, Associated Press and The Washington Post.

== Writing ==
She has published a number of articles on a wide range of topics, from the cultural appropriation of the Swastika by the Nazis, to the problems with identity politics.

She has also been published by a number of fiction journals specialising in fantasy fiction.

She is currently working on her first novel.

== Personal life ==
Thanapal was raised in Singapore by a single mother of Indian Tamil ethnicity and attended the University of Sussex. She moved to Melbourne, Australia in 2016.
