= Chinese privilege =

Singaporean societal privilege based on Chinese identity

Chinese privilege is the societal privilege that benefits Chinese people over other races in Singapore. Sangeetha Thanapal, who is credited with coining the term by analogy to white privilege, defines Chinese privilege by stating that "by virtue of being Chinese in Singapore, you start life at a higher place compared to minorities."

Under the Singapore government's "Chinese-Malay-Indian-Other" (CMIO) model of race, those classified as Chinese form a numerical majority. In New Mandala, Hydar Saharudin argues that Chinese privilege manifests in government policies including the Ethnic Integration Policy used to allocate government housing and the Group Representation Constituency system used to ensure racial balance and, by extension, "operationally guarantee Chinese political dominance". Humairah Zainal argues that the People's Action Party's "race-based approach to politics inadvertently perpetuates Chinese privilege".

The extent and existence of Chinese privilege is controversial, since it challenges the government's line that Singapore is a meritocracy and to Chinese Singaporeans themselves "these 'privileges' remain mostly invisible". Prime Minister Lee Hsien Loong in his National Day Rally in 2021 stated that "it is entirely baseless to claim that there is ‘Chinese privilege’ in Singapore", since Singapore treats "all races equally, with no special privileges", and Sangeetha was issued a stern warning by police for alleging that Singapore is a "Chinese supremacist state" on her Facebook page.

In 2023, rapper Subhas Nair was found guilty of four counts of “promoting enmity between different groups on grounds of race and doing acts prejudicial to maintenance of harmony” under section 298A(a) of the Penal Code 1871 for various Instagram posts that Subhas himself described as "calling out racism and Chinese privilege" in relation to the 2019 Orchard Towers murder, where a Singaporean of Indian descent was murdered by a group of Chinese Singaporeans. At his sentencing, the judge stated that "sowing racial and or religious discontent by alleging that law enforcement in Singapore discriminates based on race or religious grounds is just as serious as the casting of racial slurs."
