= Murder of Sulaiman bin Hashim =

2001 gang-related killing in Singapore

Murder of Sulaiman bin Hashim (also known as Clarke Quay Gang Homicide)
- Date: 31 May 2001; 25 years ago
- Participants: Norhisham bin Mohamad Dahlan (the gang leader of Salakau), 21; Muhammad Syamsul Ariffin bin Brahim, 18 (still at large); Sharulhawzi bin Ramly, age unknown (still at large); Muhamad Hasik bin Sahar, 21; Fazely bin Rahmat, 20; Khairul Famy bin Mohamed Samsudin, 19; Mohammad Ridzwan bin Samad, 20; Mohammad Fahmi bin Abdul Shukor, 18

Sulaiman bin Hashim
- Born: Sulaiman bin Hashim; 4 June 1983; Singapore
- Died: 31 May 2001 (aged 17); Singapore General Hospital, Singapore
- Cause of death: Murder
- Education: Institute of Technical Education
- Occupations: Student, national football player
- Known for: Murder victim
- Father: Hashim bin Abdul Rahman

On the early morning of 31 May 2001, 17-year-old Singapore national footballer Sulaiman bin Hashim (4 June 1983 – 31 May 2001), along with his two friends were attacked by a group of eight youths from gang 369, known as Salakau, as they were walking along South Bridge Road, Clarke Quay, Singapore. Sulaiman was grievously assaulted by the gang while his two friends managed to escape. During the assault, Sulaiman sustained 13 stab wounds and two of them were fatal; he died as a result. The case was classified as murder and within the next 13 months, six of the gang members (including the mastermind) involved were arrested and eventually sentenced to jail and caning for culpable homicide, rioting and voluntarily causing grievous hurt. However, till today, the remaining two assailants were never caught.

== The act ==
On the night of 30 May 2001, ten Malay members of the Salakau gang gathered at a discotheque at Mohamed Sultan Road to celebrate the 18-year-old birthday of a fellow member, Muhammad Syamsul Ariffin bin Brahim (nicknamed "Aki"). They were joined in by the girlfriends of the Salakau gang members. After doing so, they went for snacks and drinks at a coffee shop near the River Valley Road at 3 am on 31 May 2001. Later, the gang decided to launch a surprise attack on the rivalling 303 (Sakongsa) gang members roaming around Boat Quay, and for this, eight of the members proceeded to initiate the attack while the remaining two members - only named as Mohamad Khairsofian (nicknamed "Pian") and Sofian (nicknamed "Yan") in court documents - went home with their girlfriends.

In the meantime, 17-year-old national youth footballer and ITE student Sulaiman bin Hashim was walking along South Bridge Road with his two friends and fellow footballers Muhammad Shariff bin Abdul Samat and Mohamed Imran bin Mohamed Ali, both aged 17, to City Hall MRT station. It was then the Salakau gang members had spotted them while they were walking on the other side of the road to look for rival gang members. Led by 21-year-old Norhisham bin Mohamad Dahlan (nicknamed "Baby"), the Salakau gang members crossed the road, approaching the three boys from behind.

Norhisham then asked the three boys (having noticed the presence of the gang from behind) in Malay which gang do they belong to. However, before they could reply, Norhisham proceeded to punch one of the boys, Sulaiman, and assaulted him together with the other 7 gang members in front of several witnesses. Shariff was also briefly attacked and stabbed on the back, but he managed to escape together with Imran. They both reached the nearest police station to seek help. By the time help arrived, Sulaiman, who has been severely assaulted by the gang, was found lying unconscious outside a pub with a total of 13 stab wounds on his neck, legs, shoulders, chest and head, as well as severe head injuries and bruises on his body. Sulaiman was pronounced dead at 5 am in Singapore General Hospital.

An autopsy conducted by forensic pathologist Dr Paul Chui revealed that it was the two stab wounds - one to his neck and the other to his chest - that killed Sulaiman. The victim Sulaiman and his two friends who were ambushed did not belong to any gang. Sulaiman was the third child out of seven siblings in his family. Shariff, who was the son of former Singapore national team captain Samad Allapitchay, was hospitalised for his injury and he survived; he was discharged on 2 June 2001. Shariff, together with Imran, would later on become the prosecution's key witnesses against the gang members accused of Sulaiman's murder.

== Initial arrests and sentences ==
=== First four arrests of Salakau gang members ===
Following the footballer's murder, police investigations were conducted and the police soon established the identities of the eight youths. Within a month after the incident, four of the Salakau secret society members were arrested by the police. On 15 June 2001, 21-year-old Muhamad Hasik bin Sahar became the first gang member to be arrested. 10 days later, on 25 June 2001, three more youths - 20-year-old Fazely bin Rahmat (nicknamed "Pendek"), 20-year-old Mohammad Ridzwan bin Samad (nicknamed "Chemong") and 18-year-old Mohammad Fahmi bin Abdul Shukor - were arrested for their involvement in the murder. They were all charged with murder, which carries the mandatory death penalty under Singapore law. However, four other gang members of Salakau, consisting of Norhisham, Syamsul Ariffin and two other youths, 19-year-old Khairul Famy bin Mohamed Samsudin (nicknamed "Fami") and Sharulhawzi bin Ramly (also spelt Sharulhawazi bin Ramy in some sources; nicknamed "Boy Sharul" or simply "Sharul"), whose age was unspecified, had fled Singapore and they were wanted by the police.

=== Khairul's arrest ===
On 11 September 2001, after spending 3 months on the run, Khairul was arrested in Batam, Indonesia by the Indonesian police. He was extradited back to Singapore on the same day itself, and after his return to Singapore, Khairul became the fifth gang member of Salakau to be charged with murder together with Hasik, Fazely, Fahmi and Ridzwan. The remaining three suspects were believed to be hiding in Malaysia.

=== Fahmi and Ridzwan's sentences ===
Later on, the charges against two of the five gang members, Fahmi and Ridzwan, were amended to lesser charges of rioting and for abetting their fellow Salakau gang members to riot under section 147 of the Penal Code. The pair, who were tasked to look for rival gang members whom they intended to attack on the day of Sulaiman's murder, pleaded guilty to the amended charges and they were being dealt with in the Subordinate Courts; on 22 November 2001, Fahmi and Ridzwan were each sentenced to 3 years' imprisonment and 6 strokes of the cane for their roles in the fatal attack of Sulaiman.

=== Reduction of Hasik's murder charge: Hasik's sentence ===
Muhamad Hasik bin Sahar
- Born: c. February 1980; Singapore
- Status: Incarcerated since 15 June 2001; pending possible release by parole on or after 15 June 2021
- Convictions: 1 count of causing hurt with dangerous weapons (6 August 1996); 1 count of culpable homicide not amounting to murder (9 May 2002)
- Penalty: Reformative training (6 August 1996); life imprisonment and 16 strokes of the cane (9 May 2002)
- Accomplices: Norhisham bin Mohamad Dahlan and six others

Details
- Victims: 1
- Date: 31 May 2001
- Country: Singapore
- Date apprehended: 15 June 2001

Following the sentencing and incarceration of Fahmi and Ridzwan, the murder charge against Hasik was later amended to a lesser charge of culpable homicide not amounting to murder (or manslaughter), and he pleaded guilty to the amended charge. On 9 May 2002, Hasik was sentenced to life imprisonment and 16 strokes of the cane by then-Judicial Commissioner (JC) Tay Yong Kwang; the life sentence was backdated to the date of Hasik's arrest. When he was 16, Hasik was once charged with and convicted of causing hurt with dangerous weapons, and sentenced to reformative training in 1996. When delivering his verdict, having made reference to Hasik's criminal records, JC Tay felt that Hasik has not learnt his lesson even after his previous experience in court, and now that he has committed a crime of greater violence and an innocent life has been lost as a result, which compelled the judge into committing Hasik to life-long incarceration. In his words, JC Tay reiterated in his judgement as he ordered Hasik to be locked away for life, "Those who feel victorious in being vicious and who have no qualms about the annual celebration of one's birth culminating in the untimely death of another will have to spend all subsequent birthdays within prison walls until such time as they are eligible for parole."

At the time of Hasik's sentencing, it was more than four years since the changes to the definition of life imprisonment under the law. Originally, on and before 20 August 1997, life imprisonment means a fixed jail term of 20 years in prison, and with good behaviour, an early release would be granted after serving at least two-thirds of the life sentence (13 years and 4 months). This changed on 20 August 1997 after Abdul Nasir bin Amer Hamsah, a perpetrator of the Oriental Hotel murder who was serving 18 years' jail and a consecutive life sentence (in total 38 years' imprisonment) with caning for robbery with hurt resulting in death, and kidnapping, respectively, appealed for a concurrent aggregate sentence. The Court of Appeal dismissed Abdul Nasir's appeal and decided that for all future cases after that date, the interpretation of life imprisonment would be a term of incarceration for the rest of the convicted prisoner's natural life.

Since Hasik committed the crime of culpable homicide, which warrants either life imprisonment or not more than 10 years in prison with/without caning, on 31 May 2001 (3 years and 9 months after 20 August 1997), by order of this above ruling by the Court of Appeal in 1997, Hasik's sentence would mean that he should be placed behind bars for the rest of his remaining lifespan unless he was suitable for release upon the review of his conduct after the expiration of at least 20 years of his sentence (in other words, natural life imprisonment).

Reportedly, Hasik was said to have broke into tears as he heard the verdict. He later filed an appeal against the life sentence, but it was turned down by the Court of Appeal on 27 August 2002.

The reduction of Hasik's charge, as well as those of Fahmi and Ridzwan, left both Fazely and Khairul the sole two members to stand trial for murder; they chose to plead not guilty. If found guilty of murder, Fazely and Khairul would be sentenced to death.

== Murder trial of Fazely and Khairul ==
The trial of Fazely and Khairul began on 8 May 2002 (the day before Hasik was sentenced). Fazely was represented by lawyers B. J. Lean and Amarick Gill Singh, while Khairul was represented by veteran lawyer Subhas Anandan (1947–2015) and another lawyer, Anand Nalachandran. The case was heard before then-Judicial Commissioner (JC) Choo Han Teck in the High Court.

Both the boys, in their defence, stated they did not have the intention to murder Sulaiman, and that they only tagged along, thinking that the gang's intention was to go beat up rival gang members like they usually did and that they had never used weapons during their previous fights, claiming that they were not aware until the attack that their leader Norhisham and two others, Syamsul Ariffin and Sharulhawzi were armed with knives (they were the ones who stabbed Sulaiman during the attack). Their defence was countered by the prosecution, consisting of Deputy Public Prosecutor (DPP) Ng Cheng Thiam and DPP Imran Abdul Hamid, who sought to dispute their defences and argued that they in fact had the knowledge that some of their fellow gang members were armed.

On 8 July 2002, at the end of the trial, JC Choo acquitted both boys of murder, and instead, he found both Fazely and Khairul guilty of rioting under section 147 of the Penal Code and sentenced them to 5 years' imprisonment and 12 strokes of the cane each, and backdate their sentences to the respective dates of their arrests. In his judgement, JC Choo determined that the common intention of the gang was to find rival gang members and beat them up, and that not all the gang members were armed. He also stated he was not convinced that the boys had indeed seen the others using knives to stab Sulaiman, or even if the boys carried on assaulting the victim after he was stabbed, that they had the intention to cause death or cause grievous hurt with dangerous weapons. In his words, JC Choo reiterated in his judgement regarding the seriousness of the crime as he passed the sentence on both Fazely and Khairul, "In cases such as this where a young and innocent life is senselessly slain, the retribution of the law must be inflicted swiftly and firmly but, appropriately, as against the diverse offenders and the diverse nature of their crime."

The prosecution appealed the acquittal of the two boys but the Court of Appeal agreed with and upheld JC Choo's decision to acquit the two boys of murder and dismissed the prosecution's appeal; however, the three judges - High Court judge Tan Lee Meng, Judge of Appeal Chao Hick Tin and Chief Justice Yong Pung How - who heard the appeal were of the opinion that both Fazely and Khairul had committed a more serious crime of voluntarily causing grievous hurt to Sulaiman based on their review of the other physical injuries found on the victim and thus, they convicted both boys of that particular crime and increased each of their sentences to 7 years' imprisonment and 12 strokes of the cane.

== Norhisham's arrest ==
Norhisham bin Mohamad Dahlan
- Born: 18 May 1980 (age 46); Singapore
- Other name: Baby
- Status: Released since 30 June 2012 (whereabouts unknown)
- Convictions: 2 counts of theft of motor vehicles (1 July 1997); 1 count of illegal consumption of a controlled drug (1 July 1997); 1 count of fraudulent possession of property (1 July 1997); 1 count of culpable homicide not amounting to murder (25 July 2003)
- Penalty: A total of 39 months' imprisonment, backdated to 20 May 1997 (1 July 1997); Disqualification from driving for a total of 120 months (1 July 1997); Fine of S$1,500.00 - by default 3 weeks' imprisonment (1 July 1997); 10 years' imprisonment and 16 strokes of the cane (25 July 2003)
- Accomplices: Muhamad Hasik bin Sahar and six others

Details
- Victims: 1
- Date: on or before 20 May 1997; 31 May 2001
- Country: Singapore
- Date apprehended: on or before 20 May 1997; 30 June 2002

On 30 June 2002, a little more than a year after Sulaiman's death, Norhisham was arrested in Malaysia and extradited back to Singapore to stand trial for causing Sulaiman's death.

Initially charged with murder, Norhisham later pleaded guilty to a reduced charge of culpable homicide not amounting to murder. On 25 July 2003, despite the urgings of the prosecution for Norhisham to be sentenced to life imprisonment and 24 strokes of the cane, Justice Woo Bih Li instead sentenced Norhisham to 10 years' imprisonment and 16 strokes of the cane and backdate the sentence to the date of his arrest in Malaysia, on the basis that despite his greater culpability as compared to that of Hasik; who was convicted of the same offence (Norhisham used a knife to stab Sulaiman while Hasik was not armed, making Norhisham play a deadlier role than Hasik for causing Sulaiman's death), Norhisham, in contrast to Hasik (who was previously convicted for a violent offence, as mentioned above), did not have any previous convictions for violent offences in his criminal records (he was previously convicted of theft of motor vehicles and drug consumption). Due to this, Justice Woo stated that he felt the gang leader should not be treated akin to one previously convicted of a violent offence (referring to Hasik, who had a violent antecedent to his name).

For this, Justice Woo felt it would be inappropriate to impose a life term on Norhisham and thus he sentenced Norhisham to the next highest punishment of 10 years' imprisonment with effect from the date of Norhisham's arrest (30 June 2002), in addition to 16 strokes of the cane. The prosecution's appeal for Norhisham's 10-year jail sentence to be increased to life imprisonment was later dismissed by the Court of Appeal on 23 September 2003.

== Sentences ==
The following were the convictions and sentences received by the gang members of Salakau (except for the two absconded gang members Syamsul Ariffin and Sharulhawzi) for their part in Sulaiman's death, sequentially from the heaviest to the lightest sentence:

- Muhamad Hasik bin Sahar, 21: convicted of culpable homicide not amounting to murder, sentenced to life imprisonment and 16 strokes of the cane.
- Norhisham bin Mohamad Dahlan, 21 (the gang leader): convicted of culpable homicide not amounting to murder, sentenced to 10 years' imprisonment and 16 strokes of the cane.
- Fazely bin Rahmat, 20: initially sentenced to 5 years' imprisonment and 12 strokes of the cane for rioting by the High Court. Later convicted of voluntarily causing grievous hurt, and sentenced to 7 years' imprisonment and 12 strokes of the cane by the Court of Appeal.
- Khairul Famy bin Mohamed Samsudin, 19: initially sentenced to 5 years' imprisonment and 12 strokes of the cane for rioting by the High Court. Later convicted of voluntarily causing grievous hurt, and sentenced to 7 years' imprisonment and 12 strokes of the cane by the Court of Appeal.
- Mohammad Fahmi bin Abdul Shukor, 18: convicted of rioting, sentenced to 3 years' imprisonment and 6 strokes of the cane.
- Mohammad Ridzwan bin Samad, 20: convicted of rioting, sentenced to 3 years' imprisonment and 6 strokes of the cane.
- Muhammad Syamsul Ariffin bin Brahim, 18: NIL (on the run since 31 May 2001)
- Sharulhawzi bin Ramly, age unknown: NIL (on the run since 31 May 2001)

== Aftermath ==
The case of Sulaiman was re-enacted in crime series True Files on 25 June 2006 as the thirteenth and final episode of the show's fourth season, placing its focus especially on the court proceedings against both Fazely and Khairul for murder. In the episode, the real-life photographs of the apprehended culprits (some of whom were released at this point of time) involved were withheld to protect their identities. Similarly, the captured gang members of the show were solely addressed by their given names throughout the episode to conceal their full identities. The 5-season crime show (consisting of 62 episodes) is available on meWATCH (previously named Toggle) from 5 February 2016 onwards, and is currently viewable on the website.

After the incident, according to Khairul's lawyer Subhas Anandan, who was interviewed on-screen in the episode, he revealed that Khairul had expressed remorse over the incident, and confided to Subhas that he was feeling "sad and sorry" for Sulaiman's death and mistaking him as a member of a rival gang, yet it was too late for him to regret. Subhas had once mentioned that he had chided Khairul for having the courage to beat up a person when together in a group but stopped short of any further reprimand before saying that while it was good that Khairul had regretted his actions, it will not bring back the life that has already been lost.

It was reported that Sulaiman's untimely death was a big loss and tragedy to the national Under-18 team, as well as his teammates and friends who all held Sulaiman's future with high regard because of his exceptional talent and skills. The Football Association of Singapore (FAS) and NTUC Income also reportedly donated $20,000 out of goodwill to Sulaiman's family and offered condolences to the bereaved family, hoping that this gesture will further encourage Sulaiman's two younger brothers, then national-level footballers, to continue playing the sport.

Shariff went on to continue playing football, eventually going professional and even briefly representing the Singapore senior national team. He was also married and had a daughter between 2015 and 2016, but passed away from a heart attack at age 36 on 10 February 2020. The fate of Sulaiman's other friend, Mohamed Imran bin Mohamed Ali is unknown.

A 2021 article from The Smart Local named Sulaiman's murder as one of the 9 most terrible crimes that brought shock to Singapore in the 2000s.

As of 15 June 2021, with the exception of Hasik, the other gang members who were jailed for their part in Sulaiman's death are confirmed to be released from prison after serving out their respective sentences (between 3 and 10 years). Hasik, who served his life term since 15 June 2001 (the date of his arrest), has finished serving at least 20 years of his life sentence, and he was possibly still in prison pending to be released from prison on parole, based on whether he was eligible or not. Syamsul Ariffin and Sharulhawzi are still on the run as of today.

== See also ==
- Capital punishment in Singapore
- Life imprisonment in Singapore
- Death of Darren Ng Wei Jie
- List of major crimes in Singapore
