= 2019 Orchard Towers murder =

2019 high-profile murder in Singapore

- Date: 2 July 2019; 7 years ago
- Location: Orchard Towers, Singapore
- Motive: Undetermined
- Deaths: 1
- Suspects: Tan Sen Yang, 27; Tan Hong Sheng, 22; Joel Tan Yun Sheng, 26; Natalie Siow Yu Zhen, 22; Loo Boon Chong, 25; Chan Jia Xing, 26; Ang Da Yuan, 26

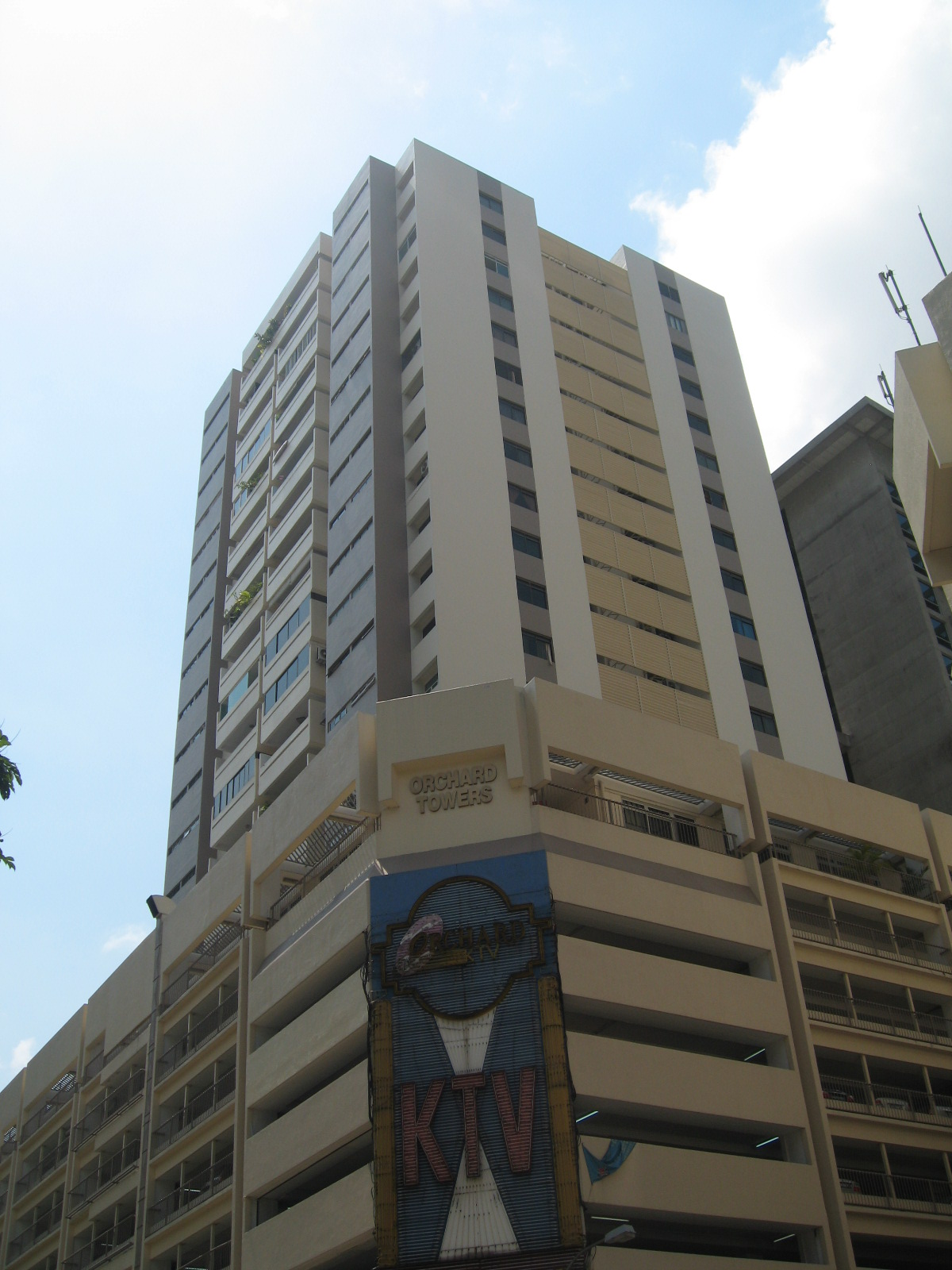
The Orchard Towers, where Satheesh Noel Gobidass was killed in a fight on 2 July 2019.

The 2019 Orchard Towers murder was a murder case where a group of men killed 31-year-old Satheesh Noel Gobidass, who sustained several knife wounds and died at Orchard Towers on 2 July 2019. The murder was not the first case that involved the Orchard Towers. In 2002, the case of British expatriate Michael McCrea killing his friend and another person before disposing of the bodies at Orchard Towers was another that associated the Orchard Towers with murder. In the end, McCrea was sentenced by the courts to serve 24 years in prison after he pleaded guilty to culpable homicide not amounting to murder.

Initially, all seven of the offenders, consisting of one female and six males, were charged with murder, but eventually, six of the accused faced various lesser charges of assault, consorting with an armed person in public, unruly behaviour in public and obstruction of justice. These lower charges were finalized after the six's respective sentencing phases, which resulted in one of them receiving a conditional warning while the remaining five serving jail terms between one month and four years and nine months, in addition to caning for two of the male members. The seventh and final suspect, Tan Sen Yang, who was identified to be the one stabbing Satheesh to death, was convicted of murder, and jailed for life with caning (12 strokes) on 25 April 2024.

== Background ==
=== Satheesh Noel Gobidass ===
Satheesh Noel Gobidass, the 31-year-old chemist who died at Orchard Towers on 2 July 2019

Born on 13 February 1988, Satheesh Noel Gobidass was a Singaporean chemist of ethnic Indian descent who was married with two children: a ten-year-old son and four-year-old daughter at the time he died.

According to his friends, neighbours and family, Satheesh was known to be a kind and helpful person to people around him, and was close to his family. A 33-year-old childcare teacher and some of Satheesh's friends remembered Satheesh as a loving, caring father who loved his children dearly and he often found time to fetch his daughter from school. Neighbours who lived in Satheesh's neighbourhood also stated that he would help them take heavy bags.

An online personality, who was a former classmate of Satheesh from secondary school, described Satheesh as an energetic individual who was a bit “naughty” but often a thoughtful person with a good heart. She remembered an incident where she was heavily pregnant at one point, Satheesh helped her open the door to a GrabCar and took care of her then toddler-aged son. Other than that, they often shared friendly verbal exchanges whenever they met each other in the neighbourhood where they resided.

Another friend fondly remembered Satheesh in a Facebook post as a good drinking buddy and friend with whom he often enjoyed drinking and eating nasi padang together, and smoking. He stated Satheesh was forgetful at times and before his death, he even left his favourite hat at the bar he frequented at Orchard Towers. the hat was later retrieved and returned to his wife shortly after Satheesh died.

=== Death at Orchard Towers ===
On the early morning of 2 July 2019, at Orchard Towers, a fight broke out between Satheesh and a group of seven people, with four of these members - 27-year-old Tan Sen Yang (陈森阳 Chén Sēnyáng), 26-year-old Joel Tan Yun Sheng (陈云胜 Chén Yúnshèng), 26-year-old Ang Da Yuan (洪达远 Hóng Dáyuǎn) and 22-year-old Natalie Siow Yu Zhen (萧玉珍 Xiāo Yùzhēn) - participating in the fight with Satheesh (who earlier came with his friends for drinks at a pub at the Orchard Towers). The other three members - 25-year-old Loo Boon Chong (刘文崇 Liú Wénchóng), 26-year-old Chan Jia Xing (陈家兴 Chén Jiāxīng) and 22-year-old Tan Hong Sheng (陈洪胜 Chén Hóngshèng) - tried to stop their first four friends from attacking Satheesh but to no avail.

According to court documents, the group of seven, led by Tan Sen Yang, had a fight with another group earlier on, and Tan Sen Yang actually used a foldable karambit knife to slash a security officer who attempted to intervene. Being one of the bystanders who witnessed the fight, Satheesh went to the entrance of the Orchard Towers to confront the group of seven after he followed them down a lift, thus sparking a physical conflict between the group and Satheesh. At the end of the fight, Satheesh suffered several knife wounds on the neck and jaw as a result of Tan Sen Yang, who was the only one armed of all the seven, using the karambit knife to slash and stab Satheesh while punching him. One of these neck wounds was fatal and it caused Satheesh to eventually bleed to death despite the intervention of members of the public. Around an hour after he was stabbed, 31-year-old Satheesh Noel Gobidass was pronounced dead at around 7.30 am in Tan Tock Seng Hospital. His funeral was held at Teban Gardens Road.

After the attack, the seven members went their separate ways. Among them, Tan Sen Yang and Loo Boon Chong went to Loo's flat, where Tan changed his clothes and took his shower, and Loo also disposed of Tan's bloodstained shirt down the rubbish chute. All seven of them would later be arrested for the alleged murder of Satheesh Noel Gobidass, with some have voluntarily surrendered to the police at one of the members Joel Tan's coordination.

== Pre-trial investigations ==
=== Arrests and indictments ===
After the crime was reported, the police were called in and within 12 hours, the seven suspects were arrested in varied locations all over Singapore; a female friend who accompanied the group of seven at the time of the murder was also caught but subsequently released. The seven arrested members - Tan Sen Yang, Joel Tan, Tan Hong Sheng, Ang Da Yuan, Natalie Seow, Chan Jia Xing, and Loo Boon Chong - were all charged with murder. As the offence of murder warrants the punishment of either life imprisonment or the death penalty in Singapore, the seven suspects will potentially be sentenced to death if found guilty.

Court proceedings also revealed that one of the members, Ang Da Yuan, was previously jailed for three weeks each in 2017 and 2018 for voluntarily causing hurt. He was also put on probation in 2010 for behaving in a disorderly manner in public. Another member, Tan Hong Sheng, was also revealed to have two previous convictions for violent offences and possession of weapons and had undergone both a jail term at a juvenile home and reformative training in 2011 and 2016 respectively. First-hand investigations also revealed that Tan Sen Yang was also suspected to be involved in several past violent offences.

After they were charged with murder, the male members were remanded at Changi Medical Complex for psychiatric assessment, while Natalie Siow, the sole female suspect, was remanded at Changi Women's Prison for three weeks for psychiatric assessment. No bail was offered for all seven of them.

=== Reduction of murder charges ===
A week after their arrests, three of the seven members - Loo Boon Chong, Chan Jia Xing and Tan Hong Sheng - had their murder charges reduced. As they, together with the other members, were aware of Tan being armed with the murder weapon during their meeting before the incident at Orchard Towers, the three men faced fresh charges of consorting with a person carrying an offensive weapon in a public place. They were all released on bail which cost between S$15,000 and S$20,000.

Later, in October 2019, the murder charge against Natalie Siow was reduced to voluntarily causing hurt, and she also faced new charges of consorting an armed person and unruly behaviour in public. After the reduction of her original murder charge, Siow was offered bail of S$15,000 and hence she was released after spending three and a half months in remand for murder. Eventually, in February 2020, both Joel Tan and Ang Da Yuan had their murder charges lowered to assault, and they were each offered bail of S$15,000.

The reduction of the murder charges against the first six suspects left the seventh and final suspect Tan Sen Yang as the only person left facing a murder charge. In October 2020, Tan Sen Yang's case has been moved to the High Court, where people stand trial for capital cases like murder within Singapore's jurisdiction.

=== Tan Hong Sheng’s escape and recapture ===
A date was scheduled for three of the members - Loo Boon Chong, Chan Jia Xing and Tan Hong Sheng - to return to court. However, on 29 August 2019, only Loo and Chan turned up in court, while Tan was discovered to be missing. Tan's mother thus called the police, and a warrant of arrest was issued for Tan's whereabouts. Tan remained on the run for a month before he was re-arrested on 27 September 2019. Tan was also charged with committing another crime of rioting while out on bail in August 2019; he had teamed up with three other men at Central Mall to attack the 30-year-old Desmond Neo Zhao Fu, who was also charged with rioting like his attackers.

=== Additional charges against Tan Sen Yang ===
On 1 October 2021, Tan was hauled back to court to face ten fresh charges of causing hurt in unrelated incidents. It was revealed that Tan was involved in several violent incidents, and two of them, including the amputation of a woman's finger and permanent disfigurement of a man, occurred minutes prior to him fighting and killing Satheesh Noel Gobidass.

After this, Tan spent another two years in remand before his trial occurred.

== Sentencing of the seven accused ==
For a period of more than four years, the seven accused were taken to court between March 2020 and April 2024 for the charges preferred against them over the Orchard Towers incident.

=== Joel Tan and Ang Da Yuan ===
In their trial, the first two members - 26-year-old Joel Tan Yun Sheng and 26-year-old Ang Da Yuan - pleaded guilty to lower charges of voluntarily causing hurt to the victim. Additionally, Ang also pleaded guilty to consorting with a person possessing an offensive weapon. As a result, on 4 March 2020, Joel Tan was sentenced to four weeks' imprisonment, while Ang was sentenced to eight months' imprisonment and six strokes of the cane.

The district court also took into consideration the decision by Joel Tan to convince the other members to surrender to the police, which was argued by Tan's lawyer Josephus Tan. Ang's lawyers - Anil Sandhu and Mohamed Arshad - also submitted that their client was remorseful of causing the death of Satheesh, and Ang stated he want to repent for what he did and take good care of his family after his release.

=== Natalie Siow ===
On 9 October 2020, for assault and consorting an armed individual, 24-year-old Natalie Siow Yu Zhen was sentenced to five months' imprisonment with no caning on 9 October 2020 (as females are not allowed to be caned under Singapore law). Siow's lawyer Amarick Gill reportedly stated that Siow, who felt sorry for the death of Satheesh (which she did not expect to happen), had learnt her lesson after her "harrowing" experience of facing the gallows and a capital charge.

Siow was granted parole and released on 18 January 2021 after serving over 200 days out of her five-month jail term due to good behaviour, for which her sentence did not include the three and a half months (specifically 107 days) she spent in remand.

=== Chan Jia Xing ===
The fourth member Chan Jia Xing, who originally faced a reduced charge of consorting an armed person, was issued a conditional warning and the prosecution decided to withdraw the criminal charges against Chan, after they took into consideration that he tried to stop the fight and he also did not participate in the fatal assault of Satheesh either, as well as his full cooperation with the police during the investigations.

However, the prosecution warned Chan that if he re-offend within the next 12 months, Chan would be brought back to court to face charges for both the new offence and his role in the 2019 Orchard Towers murder. 27-year-old Chan Jia Xing was thus set free on 17 October 2020. According to Josephus Tan, Chan's lawyer, Chan was grateful for the decision and anticipated the birth of his first child (later revealed to be a son) in the following month. Chan also expressed he would never be involved in another crime again for life after the case of Satheesh's death.

=== Loo Boon Chong ===
The fifth member, Loo Boon Chong pleaded guilty to the charges of obstructing justice and consorting an armed person on 14 December 2020. The prosecution sought a sentence of at least six months' jail and a fine of S$1,000 for Loo, while Loo's three lawyers - Sunil Sudheesan, Diana Ngiam and Sujesh Anandan - argued for two months in jail on account of his remorse over the incident and with Lawyer Ngiam having highlighted that Loo could not afford to pay the fine, he should be given an additional five days in jail instead.

On 15 January 2021, 27-year-old Loo was sentenced to five months in jail, as well as a S$1,000 fine for an unrelated gambling offence. While sentencing Loo, District judge Ng Cheng Thiam also took note that Loo had been in remand for a short period before being released on bail and that he had surrendered himself to the police hours after Tan Sen Yang murdered Satheesh Noel Gobidass.

=== Tan Hong Sheng ===
On 5 February 2021, the sixth man Tan Hong Sheng, who was remanded without bail since his recapture in September 2019, pleaded guilty to a single charge of consorting an armed person and two unrelated charges of rioting, which he committed on 18 November 2018 and 25 February 2019 respectively. It was further revealed that Tan was out on bail for the second rioting offence when he became involved in the 2019 Orchard Towers murder case. Tan also faced five other similar charges, but these will be taken into consideration during sentencing.

The prosecution sought a sentence of at least five years in prison with 12 strokes of the cane after emphasising that Tan had committed two earlier rioting offences and the viciousness of the attack, as well as his criminal record. On the other hand, the defence counsel, led by Josephus Tan, argued for a lighter sentence of between 45 and 50 months' jail and between nine and 12 strokes of the cane on account that their client was merely trying to stop the fight and not taking part in it.

On 5 March 2021, Tan, then 24 years old, was sentenced to a total of four years and nine months' jail (57 months) and 12 strokes of the cane.

Tan was released in 2022 after receiving parole for good behaviour. He was later arrested for an unrelated assault case and imprisoned for five months in 2025.

=== Tan Sen Yang ===
Trial proceedings

On 3 October 2023, more than four years after the Orchard Towers incident, 32-year-old Tan Sen Yang officially stood trial for one count of murdering Satheesh Noel Gobidass. Tan was represented by a counsel of three lawyers - Teo Choo Kee, Subir Singh Grewal and Nichol Yeo. Justice Aedit Abdullah of the High Court presided the hearing while the prosecution was led by Deputy Public Prosecutors (DPP) Hay Hung Chun, Lim Shin Hui and Benedict Yeo of the Attorney-General's Chambers (AGC). The trial itself was expected to last for around two weeks, and 47 witnesses, including Tan's six accomplices (who were all dealt with earlier on), were summoned to testify in court.

The prosecution's case was that after Tan attacked two men - patron Muhammad Fairus Muhammad Ali and security officer B. Barathkrishnan - with a karambit knife, Satheesh confronted the accused, resulting in Tan using the same weapon to attack Satheesh thrice, and based on the prosecutors' arguments, Tan had committed murder by intentionally inflicting the stab wounds on Satheesh's neck, such that one of the injuries was sufficient to cause death in the ordinary course of nature, which was supported by the autopsy report of Satheesh's case. It was further revealed during the first day of Tan's trial that Tan Sen Yang had alcohol use disorder, and a history of adjustment disorder and depressed mood, according to a psychiatric report tendered during his psychiatric remand. However, Tan was deemed mentally fit to plead and stand trial as these conditions did not have any contributory link to his alleged offences, and he also did not have an unsound mind at the time of the killing. It was reported that despite extensive investigations, the murder weapon was never found.

Conviction and sentence

On 25 April 2024, Tan was found guilty of murder under section 300(c) of the Penal Code and was sentenced to life imprisonment with 12 strokes of the cane. Justice Abdullah stated in his verdict that he was satisfied that Tan indeed intentionally inflicted the fatal injury on Satheesh and it thus constituted as an act of murder, and the defence of diminished responsibility was also rejected in light of the absence of any contributory link between the conditions and his offence. He also rejected the possibility that the fatal wound was caused by other members of Tan's group as what the defence tried to argue in court; the defence pinned the blame on Chan Jia Xing especially since the CCTV evidence captured Chan holding a black object at the time of the fight, but it was refuted by the judge who found it likely to be an e-cigarette. At the time of the judgement, Tan's father was present in court and Tan was given permission to speak to his father and four other relatives.

Prior to Tan's sentencing, the prosecution, having expressed their intention to not seek the death penalty, cited the precedent case of the 2020 Punggol Field murder and thus proposed for Tan to receive a life sentence and at least 15 strokes of the cane, while the defence asked for Tan to receive 12 strokes of the cane on top of a life term. Justice Abdullah agreed with the prosecution that the offence and circumstances revolving around it did not warrant the death sentence. Justice Abdullah also touched on the need to consider Tan's previous convictions, including voluntarily causing hurt in 2011 as well as affray and criminal intimidation in 2014, but he found no initiative to have them taken into account during sentencing, given the length of time that had passed and the difference in severity with the present murder charge. Due to Tan's conviction for murder, the other charges pending against him were all withdrawn by the prosecution.

In his full grounds of decision released on 8 August 2024, Justice Abdullah further stated his reasons to convict Tan of murder. He stated that the actions of Tan deliberately attacking Satheesh and his admission of fearing possible legal retribution etc. were demonstrative of him not acting irrationally under any impaired mental responsibility. Justice Abdullah also referred to the case of Muhammad Salihin Ismail, who was originally jailed nine years for causing grievous hurt to his stepdaughter (who died from abdominal injuries) before being convicted of murder and sentenced to life in prison by the Court of Appeal; the judge noted that with reference to Salihin's case, Tan had no legal basis to claim he never intend to inflict fatal wounds specifically on the neck, as he had the intent to stab and slash Satheesh on whichever part of the body the knife was bound to land onto during the stabbing, which still constituted as an act of murder.

With regards to the sentence, Justice Abdullah noted that the prosecution had taken the death penalty off the table prior to Tan's sentencing, and agreed that it was not appropriate for Tan to be executed since his actions did not sufficiently outrage the feelings of the community and it was not exceptionally vicious or carried a blatant disregard for human life when compared to the precedent case of Kho Jabing, a Malaysian man who was hanged in 2016 for murdering a construction worker from China, and hence he exercised his rights of discretion to hand down a life sentence for Tan, and added 12 strokes of the cane before ordering the sentence to be backdated to 4 July 2019, the date of Tan's arrest.

Appeal

After the end of his trial, Tan Sen Yang filed an appeal to overturn his murder conviction.

On 15 May 2025, Tan's appeal was denied by the Court of Appeal, after the three judges – Tay Yong Kwang, Belinda Ang and Woo Bih Li – unanimously upheld that Tan did not accidentally or unintentionally inflict the fatal knife wound onto the neck of Satheesh. As a result, the murder conviction and life sentence of Tan was effectively finalised, and he is currently incarcerated at Changi Prison since then.

== Controversies ==
=== Preferential treatment claims ===
On 2 November 2020, it was reported that the police were investigating two women, both aged 28 and 36 respectively, for contempt of court over the women's social media posts, which contained allegations of preferential treatment in sentencing on account of race of alleged criminals, saying that minority people are given harsher sentences; and these allegations were linked to the Orchard Towers murder after the news reported the release of Chan Jia Xing. In response to such allegations, the Attorney-General's Chambers (AGC) said such media posts have the "potential to disrupt racial harmony in Singapore, and cause irreversible divisions in our communities" and amount to contempt of court, in addition to refuting these allegatory claims.

Three days after the women were reported to be investigated for the preferential treatment allegations, it was reported that the day before, in Parliament, Minister of State for Home Affairs Muhammad Faishal Ibrahim called these claims baseless and irresponsible. He said everyone is entitled to fair and equal treatment under the law.

Citing several precedent cases like the 2010 gang-related killing of Darren Ng Wei Jie at Downtown East as examples, Faishal told the House that in whichever cases where there are several suspects allegedly involved in the same capital case (like murder or kidnapping), all of them will face the same charge together initially, and these people will be detained in remand pending further investigations and after looking through the facts of the case, it will be decided whether to proceed with the capital charge or reduce it or withdraw it. Faishal said that the positions made against the people involved in the case would differ based on the evidence available and his/her role in the matter.

The AGC, as well as some lawyers, also provided an explanation behind the sentences meted out to some of the convicted minor offenders Natalie Siow, Ang Da Yuan and Joel Tan (Loo Boon Chong and Tan Hong Sheng were not yet sentenced at that time). They laid out that while the trio knew that Tan Sen Yang was armed with the knife and had participated in the fight against Satheesh, they did not have a plan to use the knife during the fight or a plan to fight Satheesh, hence their murder charges were reduced to those of voluntary causing hurt with common intention. They also laid out that Loo, Chan and Tan Hong Sheng never took part in the fight and only tried to stop the fight, which explained the withdrawal of their respective murder charges in favour of lesser ones. They also stated that the prosecution, in pursuing a more severe sentence for Ang in both his and Joel Tan's trial in March 2020, have cited Ang's criminal record to ask for a higher sentence for Ang compared to Joel Tan's. Some lawyers also explained that the reduction of the charges were likely due to investigations determining that all seven offenders in this case did not share the common intention with each other to cause the fatal injury on the victim, and this would also happen if they were found to play differing roles in the turn of events that ended in Satheesh's death.

=== Subhas Nair ===
In October 2020, while Loo Boon Chong, Tan Sen Yang and Tan Hong Sheng were still pending trial, Subhas Nair, a Singaporean rapper-musician, made claims on social media that racism and Chinese privilege played a part in allowing one of the members, Chan Jia Xing, to be given a conditional warning for the charge of consorting an armed person and escaped punishment for murder. As a result of Chan's case and other unrelated cases, Nair, whose full name was Subhas Govin Prabhakar Nair, was charged with promoting ill-will among the different racial and religious groups in Singapore through his comments online.

After he stood trial in March 2023, 31-year-old Nair was found guilty of all four charges by District Judge Shaiffuddin Saruwan on 18 July 2023, and more than a month later, Nair was sentenced to six weeks of imprisonment on 5 September 2023. Nair's appeal against his six-week jail term was dismissed by Justice Hoo Sheau Peng on 5 February 2025, and he later served his sentence.

== See also ==
- Caning in Singapore
- Life imprisonment in Singapore
- Capital punishment in Singapore
- List of major crimes in Singapore
- Orchard Towers double murders
- Orchard Towers murders (disambiguation)
