= Orchard Towers =

Building in Singapore

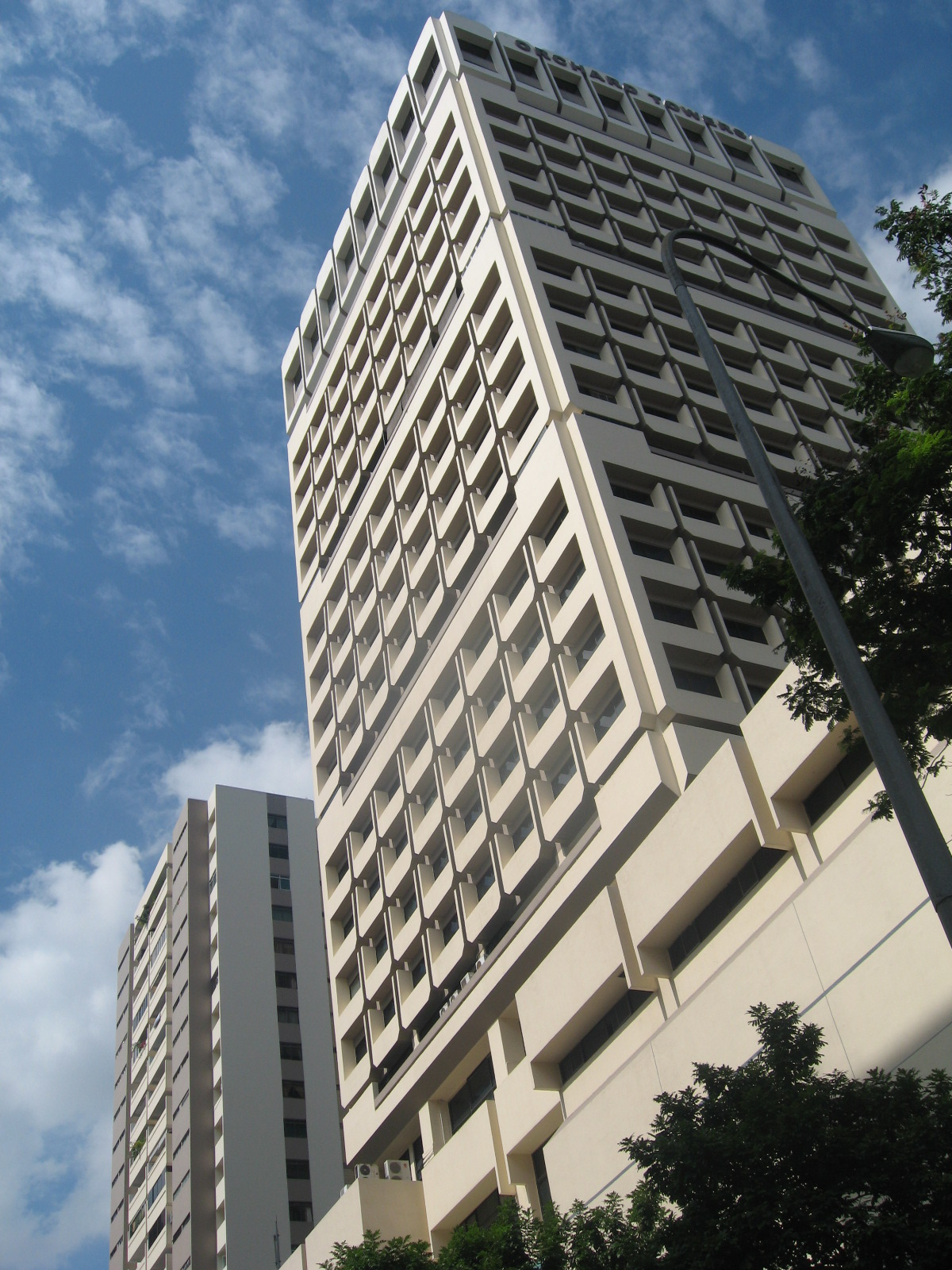

- Location within Singapore

General information
- Status: Completed
- Type: High-rise
- Classification: Commercial, Residential
- Location: Orchard Road, Singapore, 400 Orchard Road, Singapore 238875, Singapore
- Coordinates: 1°18′25″N 103°49′44.5″E
- Named for: Orchard Road
- Opened: 1975; 51 years ago
- Operator: Chesterton International

Height
- Height: 79 m (259 ft)

Technical details
- Floor count: 18

Orchard Towers is an 18-story office building in Singapore located on the corner of Claymore Road and Orchard Road. Construction was completed in 1975. The first five floors are a combination of bars and retail outlets with the remainder leased as offices. During the day the building functions as a retail and office style building, but the building is best known as a landmark entertainment complex famously described as the "Four Floors of Whores" or simply the "Four Floors". In addition, one of the towers houses 58 freehold condominium residential units.

Orchard Tower houses the Embassy of Romania on the 8th floor, Honorary Consulate of Mauritius on the 9th floor and the Embassy of Cambodia on the 10th floor.

== Overview ==
Located at the junction of Orchard and Claymore Roads, and occupying two freehold plots with a total area of 66,000 square feet (6,100 m^{2}), Orchard Towers comprises two separate buildings straddling Claymore Drive. Linked together by an overhead walkway, each building consists of a tower block and a podium. The building facing Orchard Road comprises a 18-storey office tower and a six-storey podium, while the other building comprises a 17-storey residential tower block and a seven-storey podium. The lower floors of both podiums, and the basement, are set aside for commercial use, while the upper floors of the seven-storey podium houses the development's carpark.

Orchard Towers differs from conventional Singapore red light districts such as that in Geylang. Instead of providing brothels, Orchard Towers serves as an establishment where clients are able to meet and pick up prostitutes whom they take to nearby hotels. These prostitutes are mostly freelancers who are in Singapore on tourist visas and thus working illegally, and the complex is thus regularly raided by police. The prostitutes are primarily from Thailand, Philippines, Indonesia with a few from Vietnam and Eastern Europe. In the early 2010s well-known bars in the shopping mall included Ipanema, Top 5 (formerly known as Top Ten), Harry's Bar and Naughty Girl.

The mall includes basic amenities such as ATMs, as well as a supermarket and a convenience store.

== History ==
Plans for the development of Orchard Towers were first drawn up by Golden Bay Realty in the early 1970s. Conceived as a "multi-purpose development", the development included offices, retail space, and residential units, and was expected to cost S$35 million. Sime Darby acquired the development in May 1973, as part of their takeover of Golden Bay Realty, and the building was completed by 1975.

Upon completion, Orchard Towers contained a roof garden, a 450-seat theater, and 150 retail units in the building along Orchard Road, as well as 58 residential units and a two-floor supermarket in the other building.

A cinema was located on level 4 in the early 1980s. It was subsequently converted into a nightclub and performance space called Top Ten, later renamed Top 5. By the mid-2000s the building's nighttime prostitution had come to dominate its daytime retailing of electronic goods and jewellery. The sex workers and their clients were mostly foreign. By the mid-2010s the building was ageing and run-down in comparison to the majority of up-market shopping malls on Orchard Road, with its retail units tenanted by sex shops, beauty parlours and girlie bars.

In July 2022, nightlife operators at Orchard Towers were notified that their licenses were not being renewed, which the Singapore Police Force attributed to continued issues regarding public safety and vice activities at the development. In an attempt to get the police to reconsider, the nightlife operators shortened their operating hours, and the mall's business association hired additional security guards, but as of January 2023, the police remained firm on their decision not to renew the licenses. Nevertheless, in April 2023, the police subsequently extended the nightspots' licenses by two months, which was to allow for the nightspots to move out more smoothly. By October 2023, all the nightspots in Orchard Towers had moved out or closed down.

In December 2023, the mall's operator announced plans to refresh Orchard Towers. These plans included the replacement of the mall's facade, and bringing in more "family-friendly" tenants such as tuition centres and food and beverage outlets in place of the massage parlours and nightspots that had moved out. Nevertheless, CNA reported that there still were vice activities at the mall.

In January 2025, Cornerstone Heritage purchased about 19,000 sq ft of space on the fourth floor of Orchard Towers for S$54.5 million (US$40.2 million). The space, previously occupied by Top 5 and Crazy Horse, was sold for S$2,825 per sq ft based on a total strata area of 19,289 sq ft. The shareholders of Cornerstone Heritage include Yang Tuck Yoong and Daphne Yip - the founders and senior pastors of Cornerstone Community Church - and Timothy Chong, a fellow pastor at the church. The seller was the Sassoon Family, formally of The Coffee Bean & Tea Leaf Brand.

== Orchard Towers double murders (2002) ==
On 2 January 2002, Michael McCrea (also known as Mike Townsend), a British expatriate in his 40s, murdered his driver friend Kho Nai Guan (46) and Kho's fiancée Lan Ya Ming (30) in his apartment in Pinewood Garden. Audrey Ong helped McCrea in the murder. After the murders, the bodies of the two deceased were left inside a silver Daewoo Chairman 400 which was abandoned on the 6th storey of the Orchard Towers car park. Peter Chong discovered the car on 7 January 2002 and informed the car park's security guards, who informed the Singapore police. The case is known as the Orchard Towers double murders.

Both fled to Australia. Ong was extradited back to Singapore in 2002, and sentenced on 7 February 2003 to 12 years in jail for helping McCrea to dispose of the bodies. McCrea was extradited on 27 September 2005, and sentenced on 29 June 2006 to a total of 24 years in jail for two amended charges of culpable homicide not amounting to murder (10 years for each amended charge) and one charge of causing evidence to disappear (4 years for the third charge). McCrea's appeal for a lighter jail term was thrown out by the Court of Appeal of Singapore.

== Orchard Towers murder (2019) ==
On 2 July 2019, a group of seven people took part in the murder of Satheesh Noel Gobidass. The assailants were Tan Sen Yang, 27, Ang Da Yuan, 26, Joel Tan Yun Sheng, 26, Natalie Siow Yu Zhen, 22, Loo Boon Chong, 25, Tan Hong Sheng, 22, and Chan Jia Xing, 26.

The police received a call for assistance at Orchard Towers at 6.25am on the day of the incident. The victim was taken to Tan Tock Seng Hospital, where he was pronounced dead at 7.25am.

Shopkeepers at Orchard Towers said they heard a group of people shouting and fighting in the early morning. The fight allegedly originated in the Naughty Girl Club, which led the group to commit the murder.

In 2024, Tan Sen Yang was convicted of murder and was awarded a life sentence and caning of 12 strokes by the High Court.

== Gallery ==
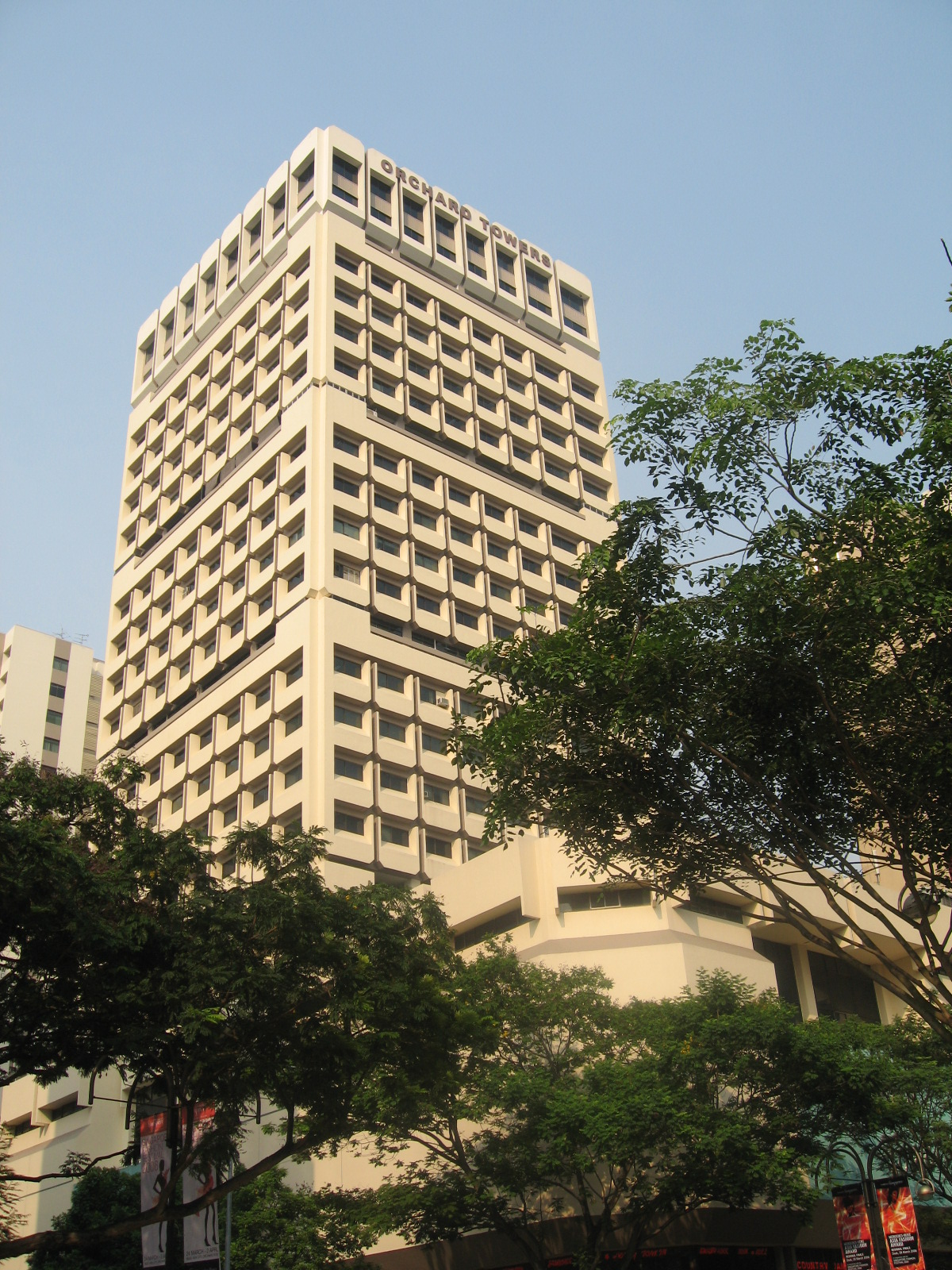

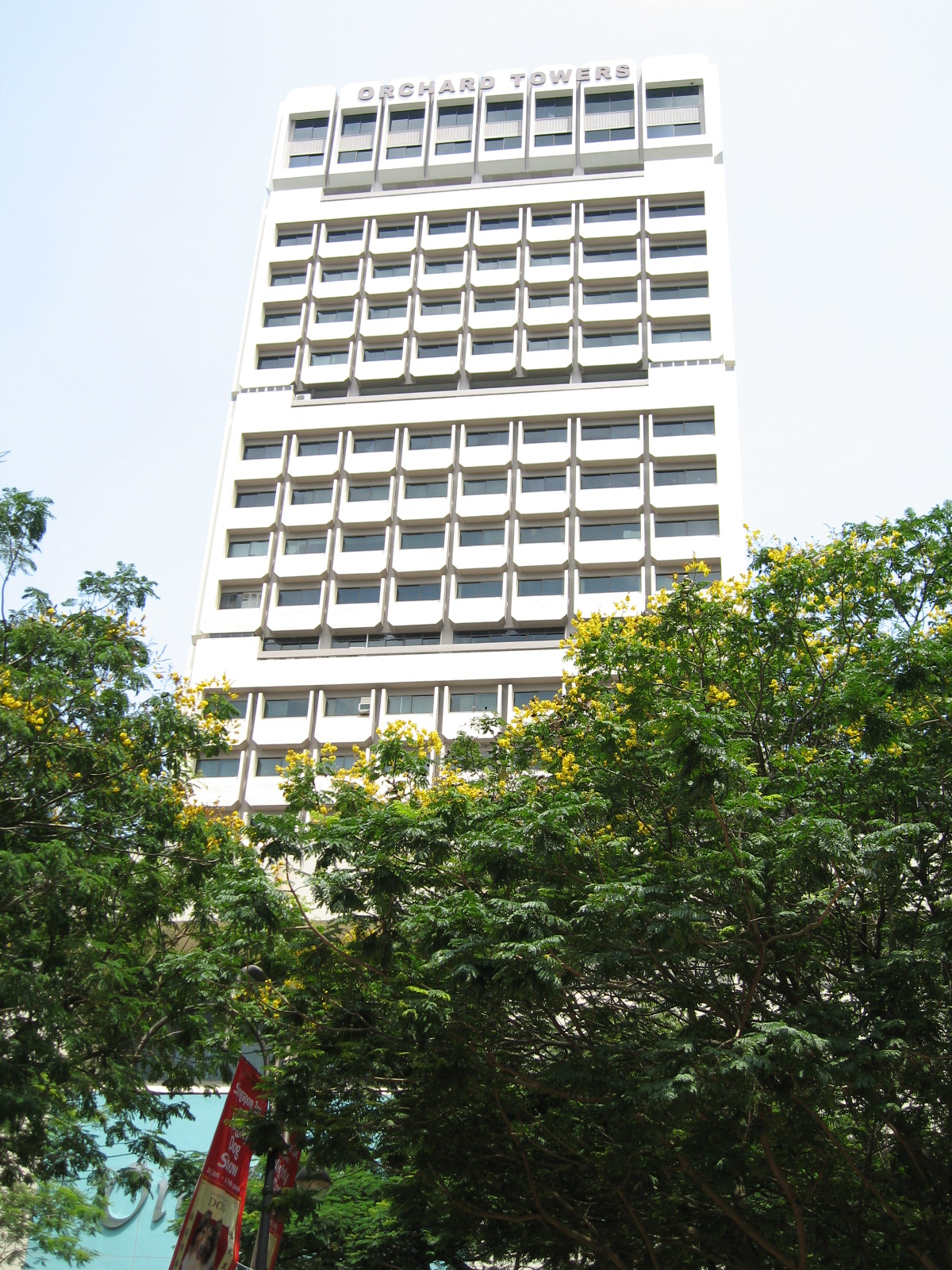

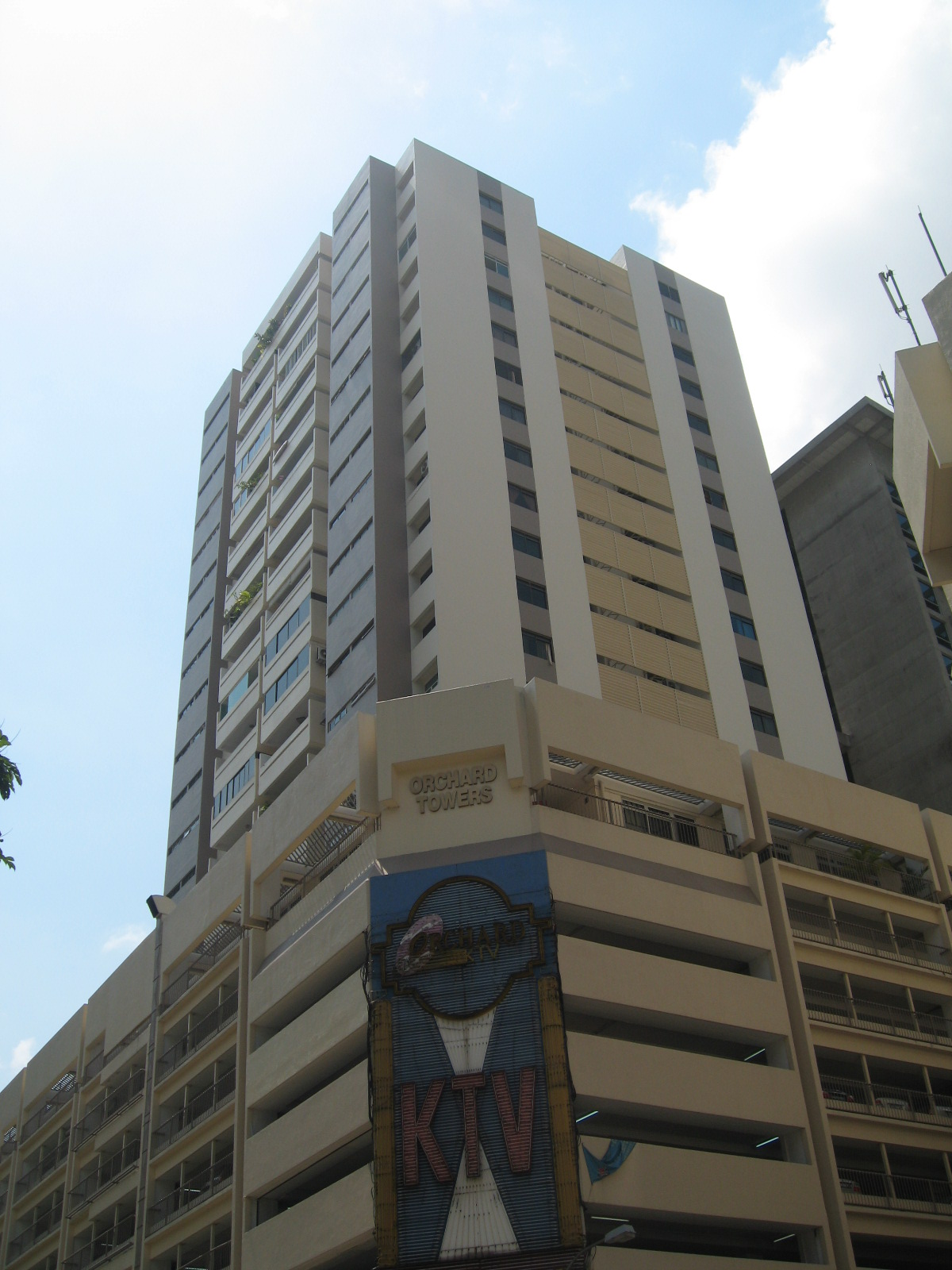

== See also ==
- Prostitution in Singapore
