= Mohamed Shalleh Abdul Latiff =

Singaporean delivery driver executed for diamorphine trafficking (1984–2023)

- Born: Mohamed Shalleh bin Abdul Latiff; 1984; Singapore
- Died: 3 August 2023 (aged 39); Changi Prison, Singapore
- Cause of death: Execution by hanging
- Occupation: Delivery driver (former)
- Status: Executed
- Conviction: Drug trafficking (one count)
- Criminal charge: Trafficking of 54.04 g (1.906 oz) of diamorphine
- Penalty: Death (mandatory; x1)

Mohamed Shalleh bin Abdul Latiff (1984 – 3 August 2023) was a Singaporean delivery driver who was found guilty and sentenced to death in January 2019 for one count of trafficking 54.04g of diamorphine. Mohamed Shalleh, who was arrested in August 2016, put up a defence that when he took the offer from a friend to deliver the packages of diamorphine, he misbelieved that the contents he delivered were contraband cigarettes instead of diamorphine.

However, the trial judge Hoo Sheau Peng rejected Mohamed Shalleh's claim and therefore sentenced him to the mandatory death penalty for diamorphine trafficking. Eventually, Mohamed Shalleh's appeals to overturn his conviction and sentence were dismissed, and he was executed on 3 August 2023, at the age of 39.

== Biography ==
Mohamed Shalleh bin Abdul Latiff was born in Singapore in around 1984.

Mohamed Shalleh began to consume drugs at age 14. He also went to prison for drug-related offences at one point in 2008 and spent time at drug rehabilitation centres. Prior to his arrest in 2016 for drug trafficking, Mohamed Shalleh was working as a freelance delivery driver (starting from 2015) and earned a monthly income of SGD$2,800. Aside from his delivery job, Mohamed Shalleh also worked as an illegal debt collector for a friend, and through this job, he earned another monthly income of SGD$3,600 and SGD$4,000.

== Drug trafficking trial ==
On 11 August 2016, during a covert operation by the Central Narcotics Bureau, 32-year-old Mohamed Shalleh was arrested for suspected drug trafficking activities. Earlier that day, Mohamed Shalleh paid a Malaysian man SGD$7,000 after he received three bundles of diamorphine and an orange plastic bag containing two packets of methamphetamine through the arrangement of a friend. Mohammed Shalleh, who went to Mei Ling Street in Queenstown to deliver the goods to another person, was arrested by the CNB officers. The Malaysian man, Khairul Nizam bin Ramthan, was arrested at the Woodlands Checkpoint.

The amount of diamorphine trafficked by Mohamed Shalleh weighed 54.04g, which was more than thrice the amount which mandated the death sentence under the Misuse of Drugs Act upon the conviction of the offender charged for trafficking at least 15g of this particular drug.

On 23 October 2018, Mohamed Shalleh stood trial at the High Court for a single charge of smuggling the diamorphine. In his account, Mohamed Shalleh stated that he thought he was just delivering contraband cigarettes on behalf of a friend named "Bai", and it was an offer he took to reduce some of the debt that Mohamed Shalleh owed him. Mohamed Shalleh recounted he first met Bai while in prison in 2008, but they lost contact. Both men became reacquainted in 2014 at the Singapore Turf Club in Kranji, where Bai worked as a "bookie", and Mohamed Shalleh would make bets with Bai, which resulted in him owing Bai a debt of SGD$7,000. When Bai met Mohamed Shalleh once again at a friend's wedding in 2016, Bai told Mohamed Shalleh he would allow him more time to discharge the debt, and Mohamed Shalleh accepted Bai's offer to deliver contraband cigarettes; the delivery he made prior to his arrest was the second time he helped Bai. Mohamed Shalleh stated he did not suspect the contents he delivered to be diamorphine instead of contraband cigarettes like Bai told him since he trusted Bai, and therefore, he never verified the contents personally. Overall, Mohamed Shalleh's defence was that he was unaware of the presence of diamorphine in his possession and he was not guilty as charged.

On 28 January 2019, after a seven-day trial, High Court judge Hoo Sheau Peng found Mohamed Shalleh guilty of diamorphine trafficking and sentenced him to death. In her verdict, Justice Hoo stated that in view of Mohamed Shalleh's claims that he trusted Bai too much and never knew that he delivered diamorphine instead of contraband cigarettes, she stated that she did not believe Mohamed Shalleh since he himself did not know basic details about Bai, including his actual name or home address, and his relationship with Bai was not close enough for him to place a huge amount of trust in Bai and blindly go through with the transaction without any verification. His testimony that the bundles were placed together in the orange plastic bag was contrasted by the CNB's senior staff sergeant Tay Keng Chye, who testified that the bundles were found beside the orange plastic bag on the floorboard of the car, and the appearance of the bundles would have been apparent to Mohamed Shalleh that they were not cigarettes. Since Mohamed Shalleh failed to rebut the presumption that he had knowledge of the diamorphine, Mohamed Shalleh was found guilty of drug trafficking and sentenced to death since he was not given a certificate of substantive assistance despite being acknowledged to be a courier.

== Appeal processes ==
=== Appeal ===
In October 2020, after Mohamed Shalleh filed an appeal to the Court of Appeal, a remittal hearing at the High Court was conducted, with the appellate court ordering that Mohamed Shalleh's accomplice Khairul Nizam bin Ramthan should be called as a witness to further verify whether Mohamed Shalleh was truly aware of the presence of diamorphine in his possession. Khairul, who was initially charged together with Mohamed Shalleh for trafficking the diamorphine, was given a discharge not amounting to an acquittal for the diamorphine charge and instead pleaded guilty to one non-capital charge of trafficking in methamphetamine, the other drug discovered in Mohamed Shalleh's possession during his arrest. He was sentenced to 15 years of imprisonment and 10 strokes of the cane.

On 11 November 2020, the original trial judge Hoo Sheau Peng upheld Mohamed Shalleh's death sentence and conviction. Justice Hoo found that Khairul's evidence did not support Mohamed Shalleh's version of events, and his initial denial of having delivered the methamphetamine to Mohamed Shalleh before his confession upon the emergence of DNA evidence linking him to the two packets of methamphetamine, as well as the denial of delivering the packages of diamorphine to Mohamed Shalleh, had severely affected his credibility as a witness. Furthermore, even with Khairul's evidence, Mohamed Shalleh still failed to rebut the presumption that he had knowledge of the diamorphine, and therefore, Justice Hoo ruled that Khairul's testimony had no bearing on the basis of Mohamed Shalleh's conviction and therefore upheld his conviction and sentence.

Subsequently, on 28 February 2022, Mohamed Shalleh's second appeal was dismissed by the Court of Appeal.

=== Lawsuit against Attorney-General ===
On 3 August 2022, together with 23 other death row prisoners, Mohamed Shalleh filed a lawsuit against the Attorney-General of Singapore, and they told the court that they were denied their access to legal counsel, and it hindered their preparations of submitting appeals to the courts, which was influenced by the recent cases of death row inmates arguing their appeals without legal representation, and it therefore constituted a miscarriage of justice. They claimed their access to counsel was obstructed due to the strict court orders and penalties issued against any lawyers who made appeals without merit or abused the court process on behalf of the inmates facing imminent execution. However, the High Court rejected these allegations and called the lawsuit an abuse of process and "plainly unsustainable and unmeritorious", and it found that there were likely some "perfectly valid and legitimate reasons" why lawyers did not agree to represent these inmates outside of the costs orders, and hence, it found no tangible evidence to back the claims that lawyers were threatened by the court penalties to not take up these cases and argue the appeals that contained no merit. Subsequently, on 4 August 2022, the Court of Appeal rejected the follow-up appeal by the prisoners against the High Court's verdict. Just a day after the appeal, one of Mohamed Shalleh's fellow plaintiffs, Abdul Rahim Shapiee, was put to death alongside his co-accused Ong Seow Ping (who was not involved in the lawsuit) for diamorphine trafficking.

== Death warrant ==
On 28 July 2023, it was reported by the media that 39-year-old Mohamed Shalleh bin Abdul Latiff, who by then was incarcerated on death row for four years, was scheduled to hang on 3 August 2023. Mohamed Shalleh's identity was initially not revealed when his execution order was first released to the public.

On the same date when Mohamed Shalleh's death warrant was made public, Singapore had just authorised the execution of Saridewi Djamani, a 45-year-old Singaporean drug trafficker who became the first woman to be put to death in 19 years after the hanging of Yen May Woen in March 2004, and many rights activists were critical of the government's decision to hang Saridewi, as well as the three other drug convicts (including marijuana trafficker Tangaraju Suppiah) hanged before her during that year of 2023.

In response to the execution notice of Mohamed Shalleh, human rights group Transformative Justice Collective (TJC), which first received news of the execution order, made a public statement to condemn the upcoming execution to the effect that the TJC "condemns, in the strongest terms, the state's bloodthirsty streak. We demand an immediate moratorium on the use of the death penalty." Amnesty International, an international human rights group which focused on the abolition of capital punishment, described Singapore's recent spate of executions as "unlawful", and citing the recent move by Ghana to abolish the death penalty that same month, the group urged Singapore to align itself with the international trend to abolish capital punishment. The European Union also submitted a public appeal on 1 August 2023 for Mohamed Shalleh's death sentence to be commuted to life imprisonment. Human Rights Watch also criticised the upcoming hanging of Mohamed Shalleh (as well as the recent executions of Saridewi and another drug trafficker, Mohd Aziz Hussain), stating that the death penalty is "an inherently cruel and unusual punishment" that should be abolished.

== Execution ==
On the Thursday morning of 3 August 2023, 39-year-old Mohamed Shalleh bin Abdul Latiff was hanged in Changi Prison. Confirming that Mohamed Shalleh was put to death as scheduled, the Central Narcotics Bureau (CNB) stated in a media statement that Mohamed Shalleh was accorded full due process, and the amount of drugs he trafficked was "sufficient to feed the addiction of about 640 abusers for a week". Mohamed Shalleh's execution was the fifth documented execution in Singapore in 2023, and Mohamed Shalleh was simultaneously the 16th death row criminal sent to the gallows in Singapore during the COVID-19 pandemic since March 2022.

In light of Mohamed Shalleh's execution, activists criticised the hanging. Also, lawyers and activists (who spoke about the issues of Singapore's capital punishment laws) expressed concerns that, despite the deterrent effect of the death penalty, its use on drug trafficking seemed to have targeted only the low-level traffickers and drug mules instead of the kingpins and that the legal presumption of knowledge about the drugs had played a major role in Mohamed Shalleh's case and many other cases of drug trafficking. Luo Ling Ling, a pro bono lawyer who has spent the last 10 years defending death row inmates, stated that while she remained supportive of the death penalty, she observed that most of her clients who received death sentences for drug trafficking were individuals "at the bottom of the food chain" and that there were fundamental risks which existed in the application of the legal presumption of knowledge in sentencing drug traffickers.

Even so, a huge majority of the public remains supportive of the death penalty in spite of the international criticism faced by Singapore for the execution of Mohamed Shalleh, as well as the hangings of both Saridewi binte Djamani and Mohd Aziz bin Hussain during the previous month of July. Criminal lawyer Luo Ling Ling stated that the death penalty was still relevant for use in Singapore because of the continuing phenomenon of drug addiction and drug trafficking in Singapore, which would potentially worsen without the policy of capital punishment, and it was essential to enable Singapore to achieve its aim as a drug-free nation. It was further updated that as of the week after Mohamed Shalleh's execution, there were fifty people held on death row in Singapore, three for murder and the rest for drug trafficking.

== See also ==
- Capital punishment in Singapore
