= Execution of Saridewi Djamani =

Execution of a Singaporean woman for heroin trafficking in 2023

Saridewi Djamani
- Born: Saridewi binte Djamani; 1978; Singapore
- Died: 28 July 2023 (aged 45); Changi Prison, Singapore
- Cause of death: Execution by hanging
- Status: Executed
- Conviction: Drug trafficking (one count)
- Criminal charge: Trafficking of 1 kilogram of drugs containing pure 30.72 g (1.084 oz) of heroin
- Penalty: Death (mandatory; x1)

Saridewi binte Djamani (1978 – 28 July 2023) was a Singaporean who was sentenced to death in 2018 for trafficking 1 kg of drugs containing 30.72g of heroin. Saridewi, who committed the offence on 17 June 2016, was arrested on the same day together with the drug courier at her HDB block in Anchorvale Road, Sengkang. Saridewi, who had a long history of drug abuse, did not deny that she sold the drugs but she stated that a majority of the heroin was meant for her own consumption while less than half of the heroin was for sale, and she only stocked up the drug supply for the fasting month Ramadan.

The trial court sentenced Saridewi to the mandatory death penalty for heroin trafficking. Saridewi's accomplice, a 41-year-old Malaysian, received a life term with 15 strokes of the cane since he only acted as a courier and thus played a lesser role in the crime. Saridewi lost her appeals, and after spending five years on death row, she was hanged on 28 July 2023.

Saridewi was reportedly the first woman scheduled to be hanged in Singapore in nearly 20 years after Yen May Woen in March 2004. As Saridewi's execution drew near, the government of Singapore was met with international criticism and pleas for clemency.

== Biography ==
Saridewi binte Djamani was born in Singapore in 1978. She had a long history of drug abuse. She has once served a jail term at one point before her release in 2014 for a drug offence.

== Drug trafficking trial ==
On the afternoon of 17 June 2016, at her flat in Sengkang, Saridewi, then 38 years old, was arrested by the Central Narcotics Bureau (CNB) for possible drug trafficking, after she was spotted with another man under the surveillance of the narcotics officers at her void deck for a suspected drug transaction. The man, a Malaysian named Muhammad Haikal bin Abdullah, was arrested at a traffic junction nearby Saridewi's HDB block moments after he departed from the block on his motorcycle, and they recovered an envelope containing SGD$10,050 in cash and another containing SGD$5,500 in cash from Haikal's possession. At Saridewi's flat, a plastic bag containing drugs, consisting of about 30.72g of heroin was seized by the officers. Saridewi reportedly threw away her packets of drugs out of her kitchen window on the 16th floor before answering the door.

Both Saridewi and Muhammad Haikal were charged with drug trafficking; Saridewi was charged with trafficking 30.72g of heroin, while Muhammad Haikal was charged with trafficking 28.22g of the same drug. Under the Misuse of Drugs Act, the death penalty was mandatory should a person be found guilty of trafficking at least 15g of heroin, although the law also allows judges the discretion to sentence drug offenders to life imprisonment (with the offender liable to caning) if they merely acted as couriers or suffered from diminished responsibility. Both the suspects were brought to trial on 11 April 2018 for their charges.

During the trial, Saridewi did not deny that she had sold heroin, methamphetamine, marijuana and Erimin from her HDB flat, but argued that out of the 30.72g of heroin, 19.01g of this was meant for her consumption and the remaining 11.71g would be for the purpose of trafficking, and she only stocked up a lot of these drugs for the fasting month Ramadan since her daily intake of drugs increased around that time. Saridewi also submitted a psychiatric report that she was suffering from persistent depressive disorder and severe substance use disorder, and made claims that her statements were not made voluntarily because she was suffering from drug withdrawal symptoms and could not coherently give the accurate account of the offence she committed. As for Saridewi's co-accused Muhammad Haikal, he testified that when he delivered the drugs to Saridewi, he did not know it was heroin, and instead, he believed that he was delivering medical drugs for pain relief or for enhancing sexual performance.

On 6 July 2018, after a trial lasting 13 days, the verdict was delivered by the trial judge See Kee Oon. Justice See rejected Saridewi's defence, citing the inconsistencies in Saridewi's claims about her rate of heroin consumption. In her police statement during investigations, she said she stopped smoking heroin since her release from prison in 2014. But in court, she testified she was suffering from a relapse and was a severe drug addict. Her urine test after her arrest in June 2016 also did not detect the presence of drugs. Justice See also found that Saridewi's various inconsistent accounts were an attempt to downplay the scale of her drug trafficking scheme, and noted that a government psychiatrist did not detect Saridewi suffering from any mental disorder despite her long history of drug abuse. He also stated that it was unbelievable that Saridewi would want to stock up a two-year supply of drugs to match up to her intake of one or two sticks per every three days (these drugs alone would be sufficient for Saridewi to consume for 282 days). Therefore, the judge found Saridewi guilty as charged and convicted her accordingly. Similarly, Muhammad Haikal's defence was rejected and he was hence convicted of drug trafficking as well, since he failed to rebut the presumption that he was aware of the nature of the drugs he delivered to Saridewi.

During the sentencing phase on the same day, Justice See found that based on the evidence, Saridewi was not acting as a courier and also did not suffer from diminished responsibility. Furthermore, the Prosecution did not certify that Saridewi had substantively assisted the CNB in disrupting drug trafficking activities. Therefore, she was ineligible for the alternate sentence of life imprisonment and was sentenced to death, the sole sentencing option available for her case. Saridewi's lawyers expressed they would appeal against her conviction and sentence.

On the other hand, Saridewi's 41-year-old accomplice Muhammad Haikal bin Abdullah, who only acted as a courier and provided full cooperation with the authorities during investigations, was spared the gallows and instead, he was sentenced to life imprisonment and 15 strokes of the cane, with his sentence to commence from the date of his arrest as well as the possibility of parole after 20 years. Muhammad Haikal, who did not appeal, is currently serving his life sentence at Changi Prison.

== Appeal ==
After she was sentenced to death, Saridewi appealed to the Court of Appeal and sought leave to introduce new medical evidence to support her contention that she was suffering from drug withdrawal symptoms which were severe enough to impair her ability to give her statements coherently and accurately. On 16 September 2020, the Court of Appeal approved a remittal hearing in front of the original trial judge at the High Court.

However, on 28 June 2022, the original trial judge See Kee Oon found that she had "at most been suffering from mild to moderate methamphetamine withdrawal during the statement-taking period" but the symptoms were "minimal and not noticeable" and her ability to give statements was not impaired. Therefore, he once again found Saridewi guilty of drug trafficking and upheld her death sentence.

After the remittal hearing, Saridewi appealed a second time to the Court of Appeal, but the appellate court's three judges - Chief Justice Sundaresh Menon and two Judges of Appeal Andrew Phang and Tay Yong Kwang - rejected her appeal and affirmed the trial judge's findings on 6 October 2022.

Saridewi, who was incarcerated on death row for five years since 2018, was one of two women held on Singapore's death row prior to her execution in July 2023, the other female death row convict at the time of Saridewi's execution was Tika Pesik, a Singaporean who was found guilty of trafficking 26.29g of heroin in 2013 and was subsequently executed on 15 October 2025. Tika and one of her two accomplices Hamzah Ibrahim were convicted and sentenced to death in September 2017, while the third offender Muhammad Farid Sudi was given a life sentence with caning. Tika's sentence (as well as Hamzah's) was upheld in 2018 despite an appeal and Tika (together with Hamzah) remained on death row when Saridewi was executed.

== Death warrant ==
On 21 July 2023, a death warrant was issued for Saridewi, scheduling her to hang a week later on 28 July 2023. Just two days before Saridewi's family received her execution notice, the family of a 56-year-old Singaporean drug trafficker Mohd Aziz bin Hussain was also notified that he would be put to death on 26 July 2023 (two days before Saridewi). Mohd Aziz was found guilty on 14 December 2017 and sentenced to death for smuggling about 50g of heroin, and his appeal was dismissed on 15 November 2018.

According to activist Kokila Annamalai, Saridewi was reportedly the first woman to be hanged in Singapore in nearly 20 years. Prior to Saridewi's scheduled hanging, the last female convict to be executed in Singapore was Yen May Woen, a Singaporean hairdresser who was found guilty on 21 March 2003 for trafficking 30.16g of heroin. Yen, who was sentenced to death upon conviction, failed to overturn her sentence by appeal in July 2003, and eventually, 37-year-old Yen May Woen and a 37-year-old Chinese national Jin Yugang, who was found guilty of murdering his roommate in an unrelated case, were both hanged at Changi Prison on 19 March 2004.

During that same year of 2023, before the issuance of Saridewi's death warrant, Singapore had executed two drug traffickers Tangaraju Suppiah and Muhammad Faizal Mohd Shariff on 26 April 2023 and 17 May 2023 respectively, and 13 people (including 11 in 2022) were hanged in the city-state (all for drug trafficking) since March 2022 during the COVID-19 pandemic in Singapore. Singapore, Iran and Saudi Arabia were reportedly among the few countries carrying out deaths sentences for drug trafficking worldwide in the year 2022, which saw 325 such executions taking place.

The death warrants of Saridewi and Mohd Aziz were only reported on 24 July 2023, four days before Saridewi's upcoming execution date. The human rights group Transformative Collective Justice (TJC), who received word of the two pending hangings, criticized the government of Singapore for the move to authorise the executions during that week itself. Another non-governmental organization Amnesty International also appealed to the government of Singapore to commute the death sentences of both Mohd Aziz and Saridewi to life imprisonment and stop executing any more drug traffickers on Singapore's death row, and described the upcoming double executions as "cruel and unconscionable".

The International Federation for Human Rights, a human rights organization, also made a public statement to condemn the move by Singapore to schedule the double executions of Saridewi and Mohd Aziz, claiming that it was a blatant violation of rights to life by Singapore for legalizing capital punishment for drug offences. Despite the plea, Mohd Aziz (whose clemency plea was rejected) was hanged as scheduled on 26 July 2023, becoming the third person to be executed in Singapore in 2023. Mohd Aziz's hanging left Saridewi as the only person left in Singapore facing imminent execution, which remained scheduled on 28 July 2023; activist groups continued to plead for mercy on Saridewi's life even after Mohd Aziz was hanged.

Given the fact that in the Southeast Asian region (where Singapore is located), Thailand had legalized the use of marijuana and Malaysia had abolished the mandatory death penalty for all capital offences, Singapore's trend of scheduling executions made critics considering the city-state as "out of step" with the global trend of more countries abolishing capital punishment, and the calls for mercy on Saridewi and other prisoners on Singapore's death row intensified as her execution was drawing near. Richard Branson, the British billionaire who previously criticized Singapore for authorizing the executions of Tangaraju Suppiah and Nagaenthran K. Dharmalingam, made a public statement to show his opposition to the upcoming hanging of Saridewi on 27 July 2023, the day before Saridewi was scheduled to hang. In seeking clemency for Saridewi, Branson claimed that the death sentence was not an effective deterrent and it only affects the small-scale traffickers who came from marginalized backgrounds, and stated that the execution itself should be staved off before it was carried out.

== Execution ==
On the Friday morning of 28 July 2023, Saridewi was hanged in Changi Prison, becoming the 15th person hanged in Singapore since March 2022 during the COVID-19 pandemic, as well as the first female offender to be executed in Singapore since 2004 after another drug offender Yen May Woen was hanged on 19 March 2004. The CNB confirmed that Saridewi's execution had been carried out as scheduled. They stated that Saridewi had been accorded full due process and also revealed that she had also lost her petition for presidential clemency prior to her hanging.

Also, soon after Saridewi was put to death, it was reported that a former delivery driver, who was a Singaporean of Malay descent, was scheduled to hang six days later on 3 August 2023 for a conviction of trafficking heroin. The convict, Mohamed Shalleh Abdul Latiff, was found guilty of one count of smuggling 54.04g of diamorphine and sent to death row in 2019. Mohamed Shalleh was hanged at dawn on 3 August 2023 at the age of 39.

In response to the Saridewi's hanging and other recent executions by Singapore and Kuwait (which executed five people for murder, drug trafficking and terrorism), the United Nations urged an immediate moratorium on executions worldwide and to abolish the use of capital punishment in retentionist countries worldwide.

Amnesty International, in response to Saridewi's execution, described Singapore's recent spate of executions as "unlawful", and with reference to the recent move by Ghana to completely abolish capital punishment (which coincided with the week when Singapore executed Saridewi), the group urged Singapore to align itself with the international trend to remove the death penalty.

Even so, a huge majority of Singaporean society still support the death penalty in spite of the international criticism faced by Singapore for the recent spate of executions of Saridewi and the other two drug traffickers between July and August 2023. Criminal lawyer Luo Ling Ling, who had ten years of experience representing drug traffickers who faced the gallows, stated that due to the continuing phenomenon of drug addiction and drug trafficking in Singapore, the death penalty should remain because it could help curb the drug offenses in the city-state, and the abolition of capital punishment would potentially lead to a rise in drug crimes. It was further updated that as of the time when Singapore executed Mohamed Shalleh on 3 August 2023, there are currently fifty people held on death row in Singapore, three for murder and the rest for drug trafficking. (Note: The 3 murderers on death row at that time were Ahmed Salim who was executed in February 2024 for killing his Indonesian ex-girlfriend in 2018, Iskandar bin Rahmat who was executed in February 2025 for the Kovan double murders in 2013 and Teo Ghim Heng who was executed in April 2025 for the Woodlands double murders in 2017.)

== See also ==
- Capital punishment in Singapore
