= Rangoon Road murder =

2002 murder of a Chinese national in Singapore

Wang Hong
- Born: Wang Hong c. 1970; Jilin Province, People’s Republic of China
- Died: 4 February 2002 (aged 32); Rangoon Road, Serangoon, Singapore
- Cause of death: Multiple stab wounds
- Occupation: Cleaner
- Employer: Crusade Cleaning Service
- Known for: Murder victim

On the midnight of 4 February 2002, at their rented flat in Singapore’s Rangoon Road, 34-year-old Jin Yugang (金玉刚 Jīn Yùgàng), a cleaner from China, had a drinking session with his 32-year-old roommate Wang Hong (王宏 Wáng Hóng) and other friends, but an argument broke out between the both of them, and it resulted in Jin using a knife to stab Wang multiple times, resulting in Wang's death.

On the same morning, Jin was arrested and charged with murder. Although Jin put up a defence that he was intoxicated by alcohol at the time of the murder, the trial court rejected Jin’s defence and found him guilty of murdering Wang, and Jin was thus sentenced to death. Jin’s appeal was dismissed and he was hanged on 19 March 2004.

== Stabbing of Wang Hong ==
On 4 February 2002, police responded to a report that a stabbing incident occurred outside a coffeeshop at Rangoon Road. After the police arrived, they found a man lying motionless on the road outside the said coffeeshop, and he also had several stab wounds on his body. According to witnesses, after he was first stabbed in his rented flat, the victim ran down from the third floor to the outside of the coffeeshop, where he was once again stabbed by the same attacker, who later fled the scene, leaving behind a bloodstained knife (believed to be the murder weapon) next to the man's body.

The man, who died at the scene, was identified as Wang Hong, a 32-year-old Chinese national and cleaner working in Singapore. Dr Paul Chui, a forensic pathologist, found that Wang sustained seven stab wounds and 15 incised wounds on his body, and three of the stab wounds were sufficient in the ordinary course of nature to cause death. One of the lethal stab wounds was inflicted from the back, and it was so deep that it penetrated the chest wall and right lung, leading to both massive bleeding and collapse of the lung itself.

Two of the police officers dispatched at the scene, Corporal Ong Chee Keong and Sergeant Koh Chong Kok, were told by passers-by that the suspect had run off to one of the flats around the area. Coupled with witnesses' information, both Corporal Ong and Sergeant Koh followed a trail of blood to one of the flats, and they found a man who had his hands and body stained in blood. Reportedly, the man resisted arrest and shouted at the police officers in Chinese to not go near him. After police reinforcements arrived, the man was subsequently apprehended and arrested for stabbing Wang to death. The suspect was described to be calm when he was brought out of his hiding place and into the police car.

It was speculated that the suspect and Wang, who were both from China, were arguing violently during a drinks session, supposedly over a prostitute before they fought and thus accumulated into the stabbing incident, and there were also some sightings of prostitutes who would show up in the area, although the roommate of both the suspect and Wang would later refute that it was untrue that both men argued over a woman. Both the suspect and Wang were also cleaners and colleagues working under the same company, and rented a room at one of the flats in that area itself, but their relationship was reportedly not good as they often argued with each other.

The next day, on 5 February 2002, the suspect, a 34-year-old Chinese national named Jin Yugang, was officially charged with murder, and he was also remanded without bail while undergoing police investigations and pending trial.

== Trial of Jin Yugang ==
Jin Yugang
- Born: Jin Yugang; 14 February 1967; Jilin Province, People’s Republic of China
- Died: 19 March 2004 (aged 37); Changi Prison, Singapore
- Cause of death: Execution by hanging
- Occupation: Cleaner (former)
- Status: Executed
- Conviction: Murder
- Criminal charges: Murder (one count)
- Penalty: Death

On 23 December 2002, Jin Yugang stood trial at the High Court for the murder of Wang Hong. Jin was represented by Tan Teow Yeow while the prosecution was led by Eddy Tham, and the trial was presided by Justice Tay Yong Kwang of the High Court.

The trial court was told that at their rented flat in Rangoon Road, both Jin and the victim Wang Hong, as well as their compatriots from China, were having a drinks session on the night of 3 February 2002, hours before the murder happened at midnight. According to Zhao Zhi Yuan, one of the two Chinese nationals sharing a rented room with both the victim and accused, and another friend named Gan Xin Lian, they drank several cups of Kaoliang Chinese wine and other types of beer like Tiger Beer during the session aside from eating. During the session itself, as recounted by Zhao and Gan in court, Jin and Wang began to fiercely argue with one another, and although the other men present managed to defuse the situation by pulling both men to another side, the argument between Jin and Wang began once again and while Wang was laid down on a double-decker bed, Jin reappeared with a knife and stabbed Wang, and he also injured Gan before he gave chase after Wang, who ran out of the flat before Jin caught up with him outside a coffeeshop and in front of several more witnesses, Jin inflicted more stab wounds on Wang before he left the latter's body behind and was subsequently arrested.

When the trial judge ruled that Jin had a case to answer and called for Jin's defence, Jin claimed that he and Wang were arguing violently with regards to their working relationship, since Wang was his supervisor, and after Wang threatened that he would be sent back to China, Jin testified that it incensed him so much that he went to grab a knife and stabbed him. he was intoxicated by alcohol at that time and it led to the impairment of his mental responsibility at the time of the murder. He also argued that he was under sudden and grave provocation at the time of the quarrel due to Wang's threat and his alleged insults of Jin's mother, and therefore he killed Wang in a moment of uncontrollable anger and it was also the result of a fight between himself and Wang. Even so, Dr Stephen Phang, a government psychiatrist, testified that Jin had a high tolerance of alcohol and at the time of the offence, Jin was not suffering from diminished responsibility due to high alcohol intake and resultant intoxication, and he was able to retain the full awareness of his actions at the material time.

On 16 January 2003, Justice Tay Yong Kwang delivered his verdict. He found that there was no dispute that Jin had committed murder, since he had intentionally inflicted knife wounds that were sufficient in the ordinary course of nature to cause death. He turned to Jin's defences, and he found that Jin did not lose control as a result of sudden and grave provocation since Jin had reacted grossly out of proportion to the provocation given and there was no sudden fight since Jin had taken undue advantage over the victim, and he stabbed him on the back out of vengeance. Justice Tay also accepted that Jin's mental responsibility was not sufficiently impaired by the intoxication of alcohol at the time of the murder. Since Jin had failed to prove his defences against the murder charge beyond a reasonable doubt, Justice Tay concluded that there were sufficient grounds to return with a verdict of murder in Jin’s case.

Therefore, 35-year-old Jin Yugang was found guilty of murder, and sentenced to death. Under Singaporean law, the death penalty was mandated as the sole punishment for murder upon an offender’s conviction for murder in Singapore’s jurisdiction.

== Appeal ==
On 17 May 2003, four months after he was sentenced to hang, Jin Yugang lost his appeal against the death sentence and murder conviction. The Court of Appeal’s three judges - Chief Justice Yong Pung How and two Judges of Appeal Judith Prakash and Chao Hick Tin - found that Jin’s defense of alcohol intoxication should not be accepted as he had not proven beyond reasonable doubt that his mental state of mind was affected by alcohol intoxication, and his high alcohol consumption prior to the murder was not to the extent of rendering Jin incapable of understanding the magnitude of his actions at the time of the murder. The appellate judges also reportedly commented that there was no excuse for Jin to commit such a cold-blooded and brutal murder, even if he may have been affected by his alcohol intoxication.

== Execution ==
On 19 March 2004, 37-year-old Jin Yugang was hanged at dawn in Changi Prison. On that same day, 37-year-old Yen May Woen, a drug trafficker, was put to death at the same prison for trafficking over 30g of diamorphine, and she was also the first drug offender to be hanged in the year 2004. Since that year, Yen remained as the last female offender to be executed in Singapore for the following 19 years before the 2023 hanging of Saridewi Djamani, whose death sentence for drug trafficking was carried out on 28 July 2023.

In the aftermath of Jin's trial, Singaporean crime show Crimewatch re-enacted the case of Wang Hong's murder and aired it on television in June 2003.

== See also ==
- Capital punishment in Singapore
