= Great Singapore Sale =

Singaporean shopping season

The Great Singapore Sale
- Frequency: Annually
- Location: Island-wide
- Years active: 1994–2022
- Inaugurated: 31 May 1994; 32 years ago
- Next event: TBC

The Great Singapore Sale (GSS; Chinese: 新加坡热卖会; Malay: Jualan Raksasa Singapura; Tamil: மாபெரும் சிங்கப்பூர் விற்பனை) was a shopping event that happened annually in Singapore. Although it was called a sale, the Great Singapore Sale was in fact an event that was organised by the Singapore Retailers Association, and co-organised by stores and malls to promote the tourism industry in Singapore.

In 2013, MasterCard Singapore launched the Princess Singapore Campaign where they collaborated with famous Singapore bloggers to promote the initiative. That year, over US$1.5 billion was spent by MasterCard cardholders during the Great Singapore Sale.

In 2020, due to the "circuit breaker" measures as a result of COVID-19 pandemic in Singapore, the Great Singapore Sale was cancelled on 3 May and moved online from 24 August, making it the first online GSS in its 26 year run.

In 2021, the Great Singapore Sale teamed up with online shopping platform Lazada and transformed the retail scene.

In 2022, the Singapore Retailers Association organised its last Great Singapore Sale from 9 September to 10 October 2022.

In 2023, the Singapore Retailers Association announced that it would no longer organise the Great Singapore Sale, and instead act as a coordinating partner where they would announce the date and allow the retailers and e-commerce platforms to carry out their sales concurrently.
