= Yen May Woen =

Singaporean female hairdresser hanged in 2004 for drug trafficking

- Born: 1966; Singapore
- Died: 19 March 2004 (aged 37); Changi Prison, Singapore
- Resting place: Purewa Cemetery, Auckland
- Other name: Joelle Yen
- Occupation: Hairdresser
- Status: Executed by hanging
- Conviction: Drug trafficking (one count)
- Criminal charges: Trafficking of 30.16 g (1.064 oz) of diamorphine
- Penalty: Death (mandatory; x1)

Yen May Woen (颜美云 Yán Měiyún; (Note: Yen's Chinese name was also spelt as 严美云 Yán Měiyún) 1966 – 19 March 2004) was a Singaporean hairdresser and drug trafficker. Yen was charged with drug trafficking in May 2002 after she was caught earlier that month for carrying 120 sachets, each containing 30.16g of heroin. Yen claimed that she did not know about the drugs, which were found in a bag she claimed she got from a friend. She was found guilty in March 2003 and sentenced to death upon conviction. Yen appealed to overturn her conviction and death sentence, but it was dismissed, and she was eventually hanged on 19 March 2004. For the next 19 years, Yen remained the last woman to be executed in Singapore before Saridewi Djamani was hanged on 28 July 2023 for drug trafficking.

== Biography ==
Yen was born in Singapore in 1966. She had two sisters and two brothers. Her father died at the age of 48 in January 1990.

Yen, who had a history of drug abuse, was arrested in March 1998 for both possession and consumption of drugs and failure to report for a urine test. Four months after she was caught by the Central Narcotics Bureau (CNB), Yen, then 32 years old, was found guilty and sentenced to three years' imprisonment on 17 July 1998. She was released in 2001.

== Trial and execution ==
=== Court proceedings ===
On 8 May 2002, Yen, who was under surveillance of the CNB on that day, was arrested for suspected drug trafficking activities. The CNB officers arrested Yen while she was boarding a taxi inside a carpark at Toa Payoh. Inside the car boot of the taxi, a black bag containing 120 sachets of drugs were recovered by the police, and these drugs contained 30.16g of diamorphine (pure heroin), which were about twice the amount which mandated the death sentence under the Misuse of Drugs Act upon the conviction of the offender charged for trafficking at least 15g of this prohibited drug. Yen was charged with drug trafficking the next day.

During her trial at the High Court between January and March 2003, Yen, who was represented by Christina Goh, put up a defence that she was not aware of the presence of diamorphine in her bag. Yen's defence was that a friend had returned the bag to her earlier that day and she did not check the contents of the bag, and the purpose of her meeting with the friend, known as "Ah Chui" (also spelt Ah Chwee), was to meet him at Thomson Plaza to lend him SGD$4,000. After meeting "Ah Chui", Yen recounted she went to Causeway Point to collect something before she went to Toa Payoh to meet another man before she was arrested. The taxi driver and the man whom Yen met on that day were never charged, while "Ah Chui" was indicted on drug charges and his case was pending as of the time Yen's trial was ongoing. (Note: Even till Yen's execution, the final fate of Ah Chui, whose real identity was not revealed, remains unknown, and there was no confirmation on whether he was convicted and sentenced for his role in Yen's case.) However, the prosecution refuted her court testimony and referred to her police statements, in which Yen had admitted to having the drugs and some of these were for her own use. They also cited from her statements that even if it was true that Yen took two to three sachets of heroin a week, and ordered five to ten sachets a week from "Ah Chui", it still did not provide an explanation regarding the remaining 100 to 115 sachets found in her bag.

At the end of her seven-day trial, on 21 March 2003, trial judge Woo Bih Li delivered his judgement. He found that Yen did not successfully rebut the presumption that she had knowledge of the drugs in her possession, since a large portion of her statements amounted to an admission that she knew about the diamorphine from the start, and these were largely contradicted by the court testimony and defence she put up during her trial. Therefore, he ruled in favour of the prosecution and found that there were sufficient grounds to warrant Yen's conviction for drug trafficking. As a result, Yen was found guilty of drug trafficking and sentenced to death.

Subsequently, in July 2003, Yen's appeal against her sentence and conviction was rejected by the Court of Appeal.

=== Hanging ===
On 19 March 2004, after spending a year on death row, 37-year-old Yen May Woen was hanged at dawn in Changi Prison. On the same day, 37-year-old Chinese national Jin Yugang was also hanged for the charge of murdering his roommate in 2002. Singapore's veteran executioner Darshan Singh was the one who carried out Yen's execution.

Despite the criticisms directed by Amnesty International and other rights organizations and international pressure against the Singapore government, the Singaporean authorities reiterated their firm stance that the death penalty was necessary to curb drug trafficking and it had been an effective deterrent and instrumental to maintaining the extremely low crime rates in the city-state.

Yen was the first drug trafficker to be hanged in Singapore during the year of 2004. Before her execution, the city-state's last judicial execution took place on 19 December 2003, when four men, including one Malaysian, were hanged for trafficking diamorphine and marijuana.

== Aftermath ==
Alan Shadrake, a British journalist, wrote about Yen May Woan's case in his book Once A Jolly Hangman: Singapore Justice in the Dock, which was first published in 2010.

For the next 19 years, Yen May Woen remained the last female offender to be hanged in Singapore for a capital offence, before 28 July 2023, when Saridewi binte Djamani was executed at dawn for trafficking 30.72g of diamorphine. Yen's case was one of the few cases of women receiving the death sentence in Singapore during the 2000s.

== See also ==
- Capital punishment in Singapore
