= Execution of Tangaraju Suppiah =

Singaporean hanged for drug trafficking in 2023

Tangaraju Suppiah
- தங்கராசு சுப்பையா
- Tangaraju Suppiah, aged 19
- Born: 19 January 1977; Singapore
- Died: 26 April 2023 (aged 46); Changi Prison, Singapore
- Cause of death: Execution by hanging
- Resting place: Lim Chu Kang Hindu Cemetery
- Occupation: Mini-mart owner
- Status: Executed
- Conviction: Drug trafficking (one count)
- Criminal charge: Abetment of trafficking of 1.0179 kg (2.244 lb) of marijuana
- Penalty: Death

Tangaraju Suppiah (Tamil: தங்கராசு சுப்பையா; 19 January 1977 – 26 April 2023) was a Singaporean convicted drug trafficker who was charged in February 2014 with abetting the trafficking of about 1 kg (2.2 lb) of cannabis (also known as marijuana). Prior to his arrest in 2014, Tangaraju had been to prison several times for marijuana consumption and other marijuana offences, and was said to be a user of it since he was 12. He was found guilty and sentenced to death on 9 October 2018, as the trial court found that he conspired with another man to deliver the marijuana as confirmed by the circumstantial evidence against Tangaraju.

Tangaraju, along with his defence, appealed against his sentence by claiming innocence several times but ultimately failed each time. Although the courts had affirmed Tangaraju's guilt, there were protests from his family and activists who claimed he was innocent of the crime. The government rejected such claims and stated that Tangaraju was guilty of the offence charged and had been accorded full due process. Tangaraju was hanged at Changi Prison at dawn on 26 April 2023.

== Biography ==
Tangaraju Suppiah was born in Singapore in 1977. He grew up in a single-parent family and had one elder sister (born 1974), with whom he had lost contact since age 19 for unknown reasons. His mother worked as a road sweeper for eighteen years to take care of her family.

Tangaraju, who only had five years of primary school education, began to consume marijuana when he was 12, and was first imprisoned for drug offences aged 14. Tangaraju subsequently spent most of the rest of his life in and out prison for marijuana consumption and possession.

== Background to arrest ==
On 6 September 2013, before he could exit Singapore via the Tuas Checkpoint, a Malaysian named Mogan Valo was arrested by the Central Narcotics Bureau (CNB) shortly after 10:00 pm. During a vehicle search, two packages containing a total of 1.0179 kilograms (2.244 lb) of marijuana (or cannabis) were found inside the Proton Persona Mogan was driving. While under interrogation by the CNB officers, Mogan confessed that a man named "India" (whom he never met physically) instructed him to deliver the drugs, and someone else provided him the two phone numbers to contact "India", whose description was a man in his thirties, was about 1.76 metres (5 ft 9 in) tall, had a long fringe, wore a lot of gold jewellery and drove a white van. Under a follow-up operation to arrest "India", Mogan called "India" at 11:50 pm and arranged to meet up with him at the McDonald's restaurant at West Coast Park, with the phone call made under surveillance of the officers and the officers laying in ambush at the location at around 1:00 am. CNB officers managed to arrest a Singaporean man named Suresh Subramaniam at the toilet. However, Mogan informed the CNB officers he had never met this man before and did not know who he was, meaning he was not "India". This was further supported by the subsequent phone calls made to "India", who claimed he asked a friend to come to the restaurant to collect the drugs from Mogan.

Subsequently, the phones of both men were analyzed and it was found that both men were in contact with the same person claiming to be "India", despite the fact that "India"'s two numbers were saved under different names by both persons. In March 2014, the police identified "India" as 37-year-old Tangaraju Suppiah (a childhood friend of Suresh), and arrested him after linking him to the drug offences committed by Mogan. Tangaraju was already in remand facing unrelated charges of drug consumption, and was arrested that same month after jumping bail and failing to report for urine tests since September 2013. Under the law, the death sentence was mandated for anyone found guilty of trafficking at least 500 grams (18 oz) of marijuana under the Misuse of Drugs Act. Evidence from Suresh showed that on the day of his capture, when he was at McDonald's to buy dinner before he report for a urine test, Tangaraju had called him several times to check if a vehicle matching the description of his friend was here, and if someone was in the toilets, which implied that Tangaraju was the mysterious "India" who instigated Mogan to traffic the marijuana.

According to his sister, the prosecution originally offered a plea bargain to Tangaraju before his trial, which would involve him serving 20 years in prison (later amended to 15 years and later to 12 years) for a reduced drug charge, but Tangaraju rejected it and decided to stand trial for the original charge maintaining his innocence.

== Drug trafficking trial ==
Three years after his arrest, Tangaraju stood trial at the High Court on 3 October 2017, with Anandan Bala and Kee Yongwen Kenneth appointed the trial prosecutors and Ram Goswami and Cheng Kim Kuan acting for the defence. Tangaraju denied that he was the one who instructed Mogan to traffic and deliver the drugs, or having asked Suresh to collect drugs, or having arranged to meet somebody himself to collect drugs on 6 September 2013 at the McDonald's at West Coast Park. Before the start of the trial, Mogan had already pleaded guilty to a non-capital charge of trafficking 499.99 grams (17.637 oz) of marijuana and was sentenced to 23 years' imprisonment and 15 strokes of the cane.

Although Tangaraju admitted that the two numbers (one for work and one for personal use) indeed belonged to him, Tangaraju argued that he lost his mobile phone that contained one of these two numbers, and it could have been picked up by someone else to contact Mogan. Furthermore, Tangaraju's lawyers also argued that the man "India" whom Mogan contacted was actually Suresh, who fit the description of "India" more than Tangaraju himself (Suresh was 37 years old at the time, was about 1.76m in height, and wore three pieces of gold jewellery), and Suresh framed Tangaraju to avoid getting the death penalty for drug trafficking. However, the prosecution argued the user of the first mobile phone number Mogan was in contact with could not have been Suresh, since his mobile phones were seized upon his arrest at the McDonald's, and after the CNB officers directed Mogan to call "India" to ascertain whether the police had arrested the right man, the call was received by another person, meaning that "India" and Suresh could not have been the same person. The fact that Mogan spoke to "India" five times from 1.20 am till 2.00 am, while Suresh was under arrest, served as further confirmation that Suresh could not be "India". Suresh, who came to court as a witness, was not subjected to further action by the authorities since he received a discharge not amounting to acquittal after being charged with conspiracy with unknown persons to traffic in marijuana.

At the end of the trial, Justice Hoo Sheau Peng, the trial judge presiding over Tangaraju's trial, delivered her verdict. Justice Hoo stated that she was satisfied based on the circumstantial evidence and testimonies of both Suresh and Mogan, Tangaraju was guilty of this charge, as she found that in his earlier statements, Tangaraju himself admitted to using the two phone numbers to contact Mogan and gave him orders to deliver drugs, before he later deviated from his confession and argued he was innocent and had lost his handphone, an allegation which he only raised two months after his capture while he recorded his final statement to police on 23 May 2014, and he could not explain about how Mogan could have had his second number on his phone if he had never met him before. The judge also remarked it was quite telling that both Mogan and Suresh had saved the first and second numbers with names that indicated that they were alternate contact numbers for the same person. Justice Hoo stated that based on this fact, she deemed Tangaraju an untruthful witness who lied about the loss of his handphones, and he clearly changed his story at a late stage to distance himself from his guilt and should he really be innocent, he would have at the first instance mentioned it rather than belatedly raised it in the middle of his trial.

The inability of the police to recover his handphone or phone records after his arrest in March 2014 did not have a bearing on the validity of his guilt, and Justice Hoo also rejected Tangaraju's allegations of being refused a Tamil interpreter during the recording of his statement, on the grounds that Tangaraju himself admitted at the start he never requested one and the officers confirmed that they never heard him requesting an interpreter. There was also no reason for Suresh to fabricate his evidence against Tangaraju and nothing to point to Suresh as "India" since he and Tangaraju were longtime friends and had no animosity with one another, and Suresh did not have anything to profit from Tangaraju's conviction. The judge also highlighted Mogan's statement that during his first phone call to "India" he was informed he could secure a job for Mogan at a mini-mart in Tuas. According to his own testimony, Tangaraju operated a mini-mart in Tuas and by his own evidence had the power to engage help as he saw fit, and this strengthened the case that "India" and Tangaraju were in fact the same person.

Therefore, Justice Hoo found 41-year-old Tangaraju Suppiah guilty of abetting the trafficking of cannabis by engaging in a conspiracy with another person, contrary to Section 12 of the Misuse of Drugs Act. Since Tangaraju was not a courier, he was sentenced to death on 9 October 2018. His appeal was dismissed by the Court of Appeal on 14 August 2019. Tangaraju was therefore incarcerated on death row at Changi Prison pending his execution.

== Legal appeals ==
After the loss of his appeal, Tangaraju and 21 other death row prisoners filed a lawsuit against the Attorney-General of Singapore. The lawsuit was about allegations that the private letters between the death row inmates and both their lawyers and families were being forwarded to the Attorney General's Chambers (AGC) by the prison authorities without the inmates' permission, which they claimed was a breach of the inmates' rights. The claims were rejected, and the lawsuit was dismissed on 16 March 2021.

On 3 August 2022, Tangaraju and 23 other prisoners sued the Attorney-General for the obstruction of the inmates' access to defence counsel, which led to many death row inmates (including those who had their hangings scheduled) having to argue their appeals without a lawyer, which allegedly disadvantaged the inmates in court proceedings. However, the lawsuit was rejected by the courts as the judges held that lawyers have legitimate reasons to turn down the death row cases and there was no evidence that the strict court orders and monetary penalties issued to the lawyers who made unmeritorious appeals (especially from the case of Nagaenthran K. Dharmalingam) had led to many lawyers developing fear over defending the death row inmates.

In February 2023, Tangaraju filed a motion to the Court of Appeal, seeking to reopen his case and a review of his conviction due to a change in the law regarding prosecutors' disclosure of material witness statements to the defence. However, after reviewing his case, Judge of Appeal Steven Chong Horng Siong rejected the motion as they found that even without the disclosure of witness accounts, Tangaraju's conviction would still stand in view of objective evidence and they pointed out that the lack of disclosure of phone call records could not be believed since by the time Tangaraju was arrested, the records were no longer there despite the police's best efforts to retrieve them and they could only obtain the subscription details. Tangaraju reportedly represented himself in this motion without a lawyer.

== Notice of execution ==
The execution notice that was delivered to Tangaraju Suppiah's sister at her home address in Singapore, to inform her of his upcoming execution & final visiting times for his family

On 19 April 2023, Tangaraju's sister received her brother's execution notice, in which the representatives of the Singapore Prison Service informed her that Tangaraju, then 46 years old, was scheduled to hang on 26 April 2023, exactly a week later. Tangaraju's death warrant was the first to issued in the year 2023.

Activists in Singapore, including Kokila Annamalai and Kirsten Han, as well as former lawyer M Ravi, appealed to the Singapore government to not execute Tangaraju, weighing in on his alleged innocence and the number of allegations Tangaraju raised about the prosecution, interrogation procedures and the evidence against him.

Upon getting wind of Tangaraju's execution order, Annamalai, in a statement, described the fears and opposition harboured by her and other activists, as well as the families of those on death row, regarding the resumption of executions in Singapore:

"The last execution carried out in Singapore was in October 2022. Death row prisoners, their family members and abolitionists have been holding our breath for the past six months, terrified of when the killing spree will begin again. We will fight for Tangaraju till the end."

At that time, due to the COVID-19 pandemic in Singapore, Singapore had not executed a single prisoner for two years between 2020 and 2022, before it resumed executions in March 2022 with the hanging of Abdul Kahar Othman. Eleven people were put to death in the previous year of 2022 for drug trafficking, and the last execution took place in October 2022 when a Singaporean was hanged for drug trafficking. Given that the neighbouring Southeast Asian countries like Thailand had started legalizing marijuana and Malaysia having abolished the mandatory death penalty for all capital offences, Singapore's trend of scheduling the executions of drug convicts only attracted more attention and pressure to persuade Singapore to not carry out executions.

The Central Narcotics Bureau (CNB) made a public statement to reply that Tangaraju was accorded full due process and had access to legal counsel throughout the process, and also highlighted parts of the evidence where it demonstrated that Tangaraju was truly guilty of trafficking the package with 1.0179 kilograms (2.244 lb) of marijuana, which they stated was sufficient to feed 150 abusers for a week, and twice the minimum amount of 500 grams (18 oz) that mandated the death sentence in Singapore. The CNB also reiterated that drug consumption could cause very serious harm to the abusers and their families and in turn, the society at large, and the death penalty was necessary to curb drug trafficking. It was confirmed that Tangaraju had already lost his plea for clemency sometime before the death warrant was issued.

== Last-minute appeals ==
On 23 April 2023, three days before Tangaraju was due to hang, his family, including his sister and niece, mounted a public protest against Tangaraju's death sentence, asking for a re-trial and clemency from the President of Singapore, due to them believing that Tangaraju's conviction was unsafe and he did not receive a fair trial. Several families of other death row inmates (including those who were already executed) showed support for the movement by Tangaraju's family. Clemency appeals signed by family members, friends, relatives and activists were also sent to the Istana, the official residence of the President of Singapore, with hopes to commute Tangaraju's death sentence to life imprisonment. Tangaraju's sister stated that she had faith that her plea would be heard, and Tangaraju's niece also added that while her uncle was resigned to his fate, he believed that his death was unjust and hoped that "God will help him".

On 25 April 2023, Justice Steven Chong denied a last-minute attempt to challenge Tangaraju's death sentence, stating the court found that he did not meet the requirements for a review application under the Criminal Procedure Code (CPC). Tangaraju, representing himself, sought to challenge his conviction by presenting new arguments regarding his knowledge of the quantity of drugs involved in the case, asserting the Prosecution had failed to prove the specific quantity of cannabis Tangaraju and his co-conspirator Mogan had intended to traffic during his original trial. Justice Chong stated that the applicant had failed to demonstrate any legitimate basis for the court to exercise its power of review, noting that Tangaraju's new arguments were premised on false assertions and were contrary to the evidence presented at the trial, and given the applicant's previous opportunity to raise these arguments during the trial there was no reason why they could not have been raised earlier. Justice Chong highlighted the fact that the exact amount of drugs, "two bundles containing not less than 1017.9 grams of cannabis", was expressly put to him during his original trial when he denied having any involvement in their trafficking. Also, a defence of alleged lack of knowledge of the quantity of the drugs would have been rejected anyway, as the Court of Appeal had previously ruled in a similar case under Section 12 of the Misuse of Drugs Act that if an accused person intended for any amount of drugs at all to be collected, as opposed to some smaller defined amount, he or she still cannot evade liability by claiming that they did not know of the specific quantity of drugs that were in fact collected.

== International reaction ==
Tangaraju's case has prompted international criticism, including from Reprieve, Amnesty International, and British billionaire Richard Branson. The Government of Singapore "may be about to kill an innocent man", Branson wrote on his blog, adding "Tangaraju was actually not anywhere near these drugs at the time of his arrest. This was largely a circumstantial case that relied on inferences".

The United Nations Human Rights Office, via its spokesperson Ravina Shamdasani, released a statement on the eve of Tangaraju's scheduled execution, highlighting concerns about the original court case around "due process and respect for fair trial guarantees. The UN Human Rights Office calls on the authorities not to proceed with his execution". The press briefing also called on the Singapore Government to "adopt a formal moratorium on executions for drug-related offences and to ensure the right to a fair trial for all defendants in line with its international obligations".

The Harm Reduction International and the Anti-Death Penalty Asia Network (ADPAN) also appealed to Singapore for clemency and pressurise Singapore to abolish the death penalty, with Amnesty International describing the execution as "extremely cruel". Australian MP Graham Perrett also condemned Singapore for scheduling the execution of Tangaraju and weighed his plea on the alleged innocence of Tangaraju.

The European Union also appealed to the Singapore government to commute Tangaraju's sentence to life imprisonment and abolish the death penalty in Singapore. The International Federation for Human Rights (FIDH), a France-based human rights group, also appealed for clemency and expressed their continued stance to oppose the death penalty, which they felt should only be applied for the most serious of crimes, which did not include drug trafficking, and claimed Singapore should conform to international legal standards.

Sangkari Pranthaman, sister of drug trafficker Pannir Selvam Pranthaman (also on death row), wrote to a Malaysian newspaper, criticising the decision to schedule Tangaraju's hanging and she showed support for Tangaraju and his family, asking the Singapore authorities to halt the execution. Sara Kowal, vice president of the Capital Punishment Justice Project, also expressed her concerns regarding the circumstances behind Tangaraju's capture and conviction, and hoped that Singapore could uphold Tangaraju's right to a fair trial by cancelling his execution and reviewing his case. Former lawyer M Ravi, who was no longer practising law since 2023 due to a five-year suspension for his disciplinary issues, called for more support to stop Tangaraju's execution. Phil Robertson, a deputy director of Human Rights Watch, described the nature of Tangaraju's case as one where it was "not good enough when the sentence is so totally final and irreversible."

In response to false allegations spread by Branson about Tangaraju's case, the Ministry of Home Affairs issued a statement condemning Branson for his disrespect for Singapore's judicial system and its judges. They stated that in contrast to Branson's claims of Tangaraju's innocence, there was objective evidence to substantively show that Tangaraju had solicited the delivery of marijuana for trafficking purposes, and the trial judge Hoo Sheau Peng had correctly judged that Tangaraju had the intention to traffic drugs and exhibited substantial involvement in the offence charged. They also cited the evidence on how the death penalty served as an effective deterrent for drug trafficking in Singapore, contrary to Branson's claims. Aside from Tangaraju's case, a survey showed that 87% of Singaporeans and 83% of foreigners supported the use of capital punishment in the city-state.

== Execution ==
After the loss of his final appeal, Tangaraju remained in Changi Prison on the eve of his execution. He reportedly ordered chicken rice, nasi biryani, ice cream soda, and milo-flavoured sweets as his last meal, although the prison authorities were unable to find the sweets for him; another last meal order also included a bowl of wanton noodles each for himself and his neighbouring cellmate "Sanjay" (whose execution was not scheduled). Tangaraju was also allowed to spend his allowance to treat his fellow death row prisoners with some mutton murtabak, fish burgers, curry puffs and soft drinks. Tangaraju's family hoped to pass him some religious items he wanted to obtain during his final moments before facing the gallows, but they could only pass him prayer beads by adherence to prison regulations. Prison officers would measure Tangaraju's weight and height before his hanging to facilitate the appropriate length of the rope used for the scaffold, given that Singapore's official execution method was long drop hanging, where it involves breaking the neck of the prisoner and lead to an instantaneous death while he was hanged by the neck. Tangaraju was also permitted to go through a final photoshoot to provide some final photographs of himself to his family, who also had some of his belongings returned to him. When Tangaraju's mother went to prison to see her son one last time, her family members reportedly kept the truth of Tangaraju's execution from her for fear she would be devastated over it. It was understood that prior to his hanging, the President of Singapore Halimah Yacob rejected the pleas for clemency by Tangaraju's family.

On 26 April 2023, 46-year-old Tangaraju Suppiah was hanged at dawn in Changi Prison. Tangaraju's execution was the first reported execution to take place in Singapore during the year of 2023, as well as the twelfth death row prisoner to be executed since March 2022. A spokesperson of the Singapore Prison Service confirmed in a media statement that Tangaraju's sentence was carried out per the scheduled timing written in his death warrant. Annamalai also confirmed that Tangaraju's sentence had been carried out, as she was informed that Tangaraju's sister had received his death certificate soon after Tangaraju was put to death. He was interred in Lim Chu Kang Hindu Cemetery on 28 April 2023 two days after his execution.

== Aftermath ==
The execution was criticized by Amnesty International, which described Singapore's decision to put Tangaraju to death as a "disregard for human rights". Dobby Chew, the executive coordinator of the Anti-Death Penalty Asia Network, criticised the execution as one that "hit another peak of infamy" where a person had been found guilty and put to death despite having never touched the drugs. Maya Foa, a director at Reprieve, a non-governmental organization, stated that the execution of Tangaraju should serve as an inspiration to argue for the end of capital punishment, which she described as a "cruel and ineffective practice". M Ravi, who also criticized the execution, claimed that there was a "conflict of interest" in Tangaraju's case as he stated that Justice Steven Chong, who heard the appeal prior to Tangaraju's hanging, was also the attorney-general when Tangaraju was first charged with trafficking marijuana in 2014, and said that Justice Chong should have disqualified himself before hearing the appeal. Former political prisoner Teo Soh Lung, who was one of the main conspirators of a 1987 communist plot, also criticized the execution, questioning that there was a "miscarriage of justice" in Tangaraju's case. Due to the fact that a majority of the world was legalizing the use of marijuana and had meted out sentences lower than death in certain countries where smuggling or consuming marijuana was illegal, Singapore's implementation of the death penalty for marijuana trafficking and Tangaraju's execution became a worldwide controversy.

A 32-year-old Singaporean trans woman named Vickreman Harvey Chettiar was remanded at the Institute of Mental Health (IMH) on 5 May 2023 after her arrest and indictment for threatening to cause bodily harm or death to President Halimah Yacob, with evidence showing that her threat was made in relation to her social media posts, which showed her displeasure and opposition to the death sentence of Tangaraju, who was hanged after failing to obtain presidential clemency one final time. In total, Vickreman faced a total of 12 criminal charges, mainly one count of calling for the death of then President Halimah and another 11 counts of threatening to cause bodily harm, insulting two female judges and other offences. Vickreman was sentenced to ten months and 12 weeks' jail on 14 February 2025, after pleading guilty to three counts of harassment and one count of fabricating false evidence.

In rebuttal to the condemnation by the UN Human Rights Office (which likewise called for the abolition of capital punishment and a moratorium on executions in Singapore), the Singapore government reiterated that during the course of his trial and appeal, Tangaraju, like all other death row prisoners in Singapore, was accorded full due process throughout and they stated that all countries have the sovereign right to choose the approach that best suits their own circumstances, and that the death penalty played an important role in having not only eradicated the firearm violence rate and kidnapping rate, but also to greatly reduce the rate of opium trafficking by 66% upon the introduction of the mandatory death sentence for opium trafficking in 1990, and they stated that drug abuse was a pervasive problem that the government sought to stem and reduce the harm drugs caused to families and users, and they stated it was regrettable that the UN Human Rights Office chose to gloss over the more severe harm that drug abuse had inflicted upon thousands of people and focused on the implications behind the single execution of a drug trafficker.

Also, many lawyers, including Josephus Tan and Chung Ting Fai, in Singapore were critical of the international criticisms towards the use of the death penalty in Singapore, stating that the laws in Singapore were fair and impartial for all suspects facing the death penalty in terms of the circumstances on whether they were deserving of the death penalty, with Chung citing the case of Cheong Chun Yin to show that the law would spare drug traffickers whose conduct were undeserving of execution. Cheong was originally on death row for five years under a mandatory death sentence since 2010 due to a 2008 drug trafficking conviction, before Cheong's role as a drug courier allowed him to commute his sentence to life imprisonment and 15 strokes of the cane in 2015 under the 2013 new drug laws of Singapore. Several experts and speakers from other countries also called for the need to respect the decision of Singapore and the other retentionist countries for continuing their use of capital punishment even in the face of the growing trend of abolition in a majority of the international community, and emphasised that there was no consensus on the universal abolition of capital punishment or what constituted the "most serious crimes" that warrant the death sentence, and there were no existing international laws that prohibit capital punishment.

On 19 May 2023, the Ministry of Home Affairs (MHA) issued correction orders under the Protection from Online Falsehoods and Manipulation Act (Pofma) against activist Kirsten Han, former lawyer M Ravi and the opposition newspaper The Online Citizen for spreading falsehoods in relation to Tangaraju's death sentence and trial. The MHA clarified that Tangaraju's allegations of being denied an interpreter were found to be false and rejected by the High Court, and with regards to Steven Chong, the judge who heard Tangaraju's appeal and also coincidentally the Attorney-General who served his tenure while Tangaraju was still undergoing trial for marijuana trafficking, the MHA clarified that Tangaraju actually was told before his appeal about Justice Chong's past tenure as Attorney-General and his appointment to hear the appeal, and neither Tangaraju nor his counsel raised any objections about Justice Chong presiding over the case at the Court of Appeal, which proven false Ravi's allegations of Tangaraju being unfairly treated with the appointment of the former attorney general Steven Chong as the judge hearing his appeal. The MHA also rebutted the false information that Tangaraju was served with a "not guilty" verdict in his case, pointing out that Tangaraju was found guilty and had his sentence upheld through appeal, and reiterated that he was accorded full due process with the representation of counsel throughout.

Merely three weeks after Tangaraju was hanged, on 17 May 2023, a 36-year-old Singaporean man named Muhammad Faizal Mohd Shariff became the second drug trafficker on death row to be put to death in Singapore in the year of 2023. Muhammad Faizal, who was arrested in February 2016, was found guilty of smuggling 1.5 kg of marijuana and sentenced to hang in January 2019, and had lost his final appeal to commute his sentence to life imprisonment the day before his execution, which the authorities confirmed in a statement despite not naming Muhammad Faizal out of consideration for his family's need for privacy. Due to the executions of Tangaraju and Muhammad Faizal, Singapore's use of the death penalty for drugs were brought into international spotlight, with many commenting on the harsh laws of the city-state and feared the possibility that Singapore would ramp up its executions and showed no intention of backing down in spite of the international pressure against Singapore to not carry out executions and ongoing calls to commute the death sentences of all 54 inmates on Singapore's death row to life imprisonment.

On 30 May 2023, a month after Tangaraju was hanged, the appeal by anti-death penalty group Transformative Collective Justice to cancel the POFMA correction orders were rejected by the Minister for Communications and Information and Second Minister for Home Affairs Josephine Teo. According to the official statements released by the MHA, it was said that the authorities were satisfied that all the conditions for issuing the correction direction were fulfilled when the activist group was given the order for spreading false information about the execution of Tangaraju. The rejection of the group's application was also accordingly relayed to the group at the time of the announcement.

== See also ==
- Capital punishment in Singapore
