= COVID-19 pandemic in Singapore =

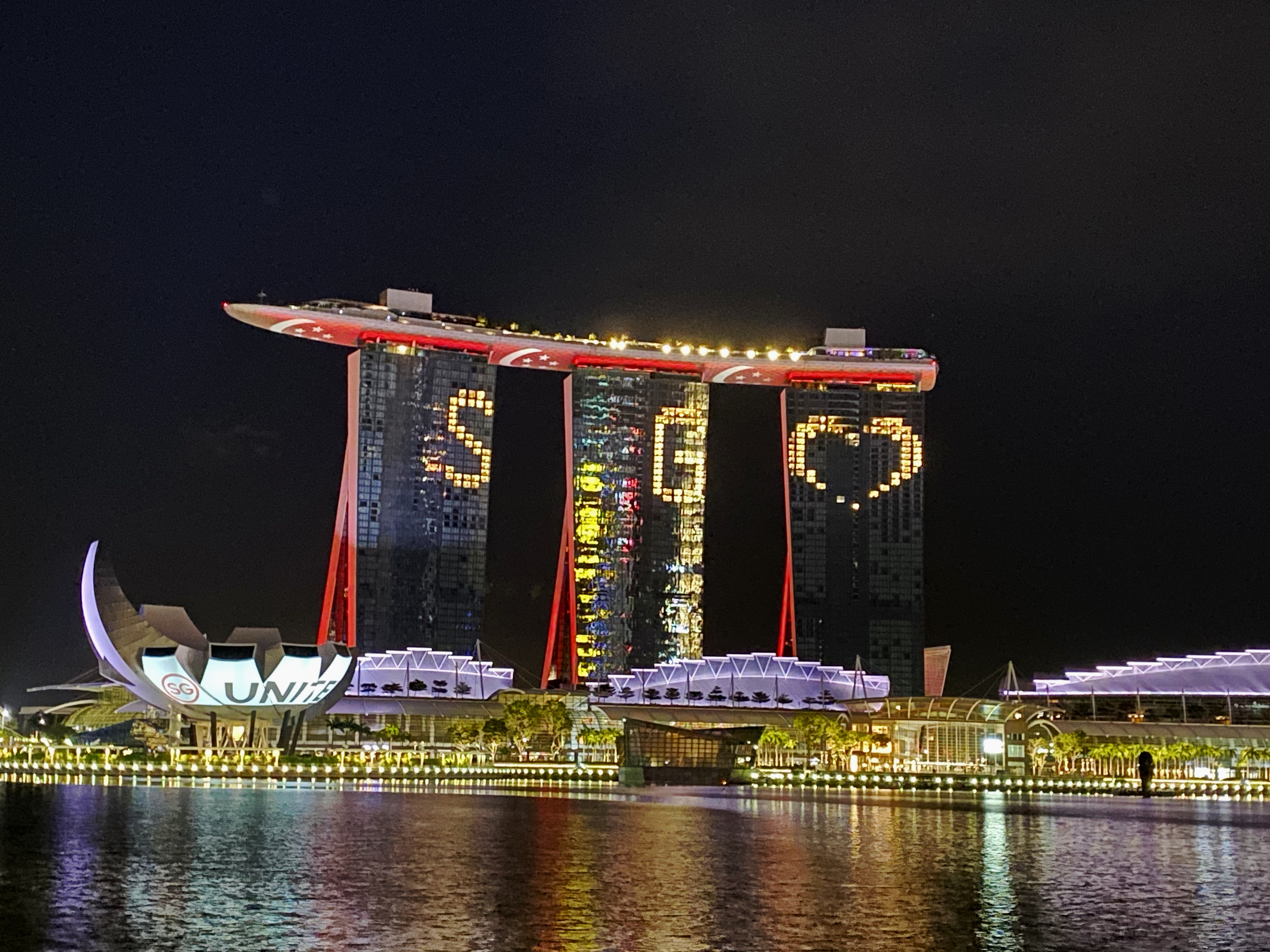
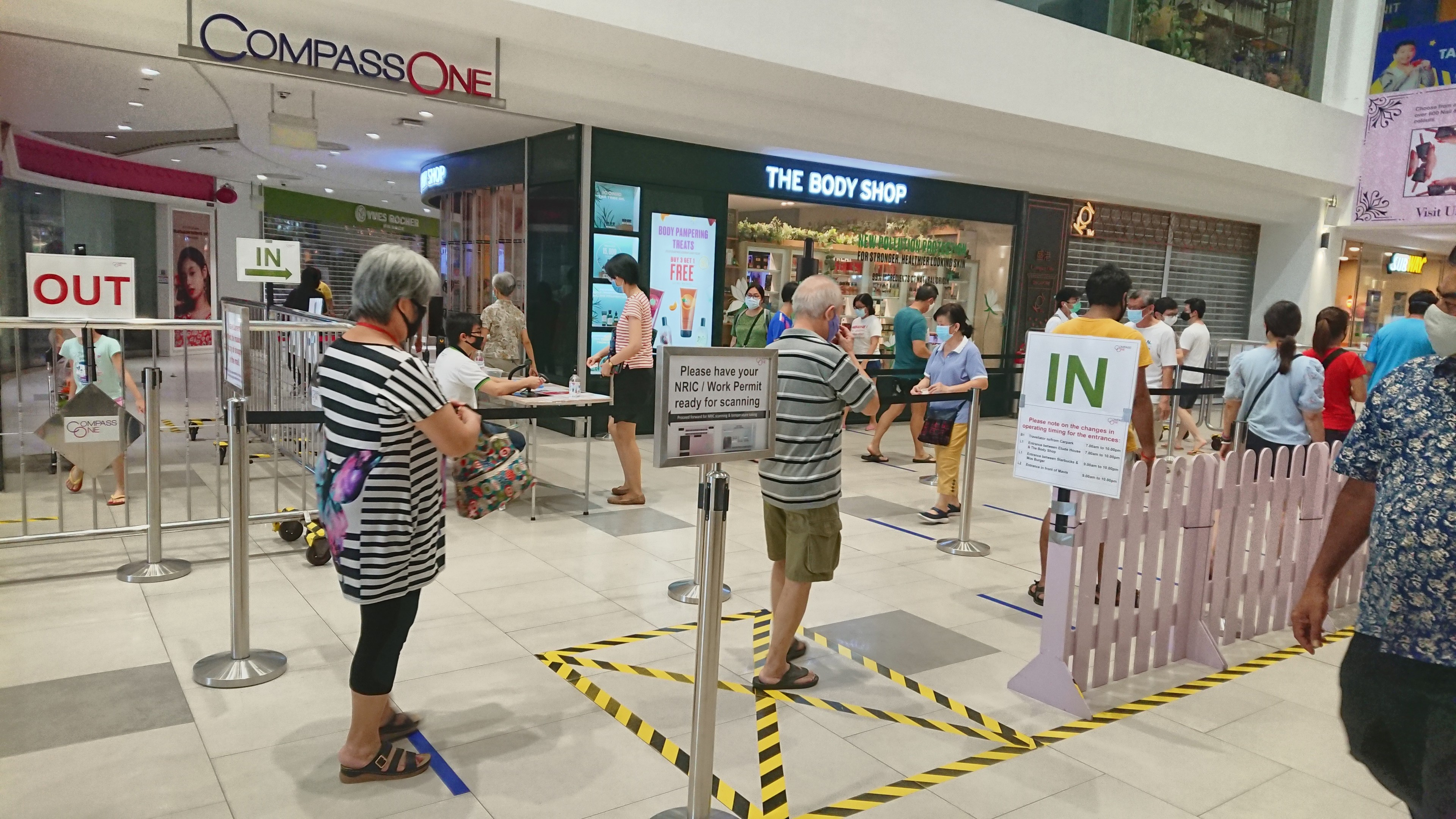
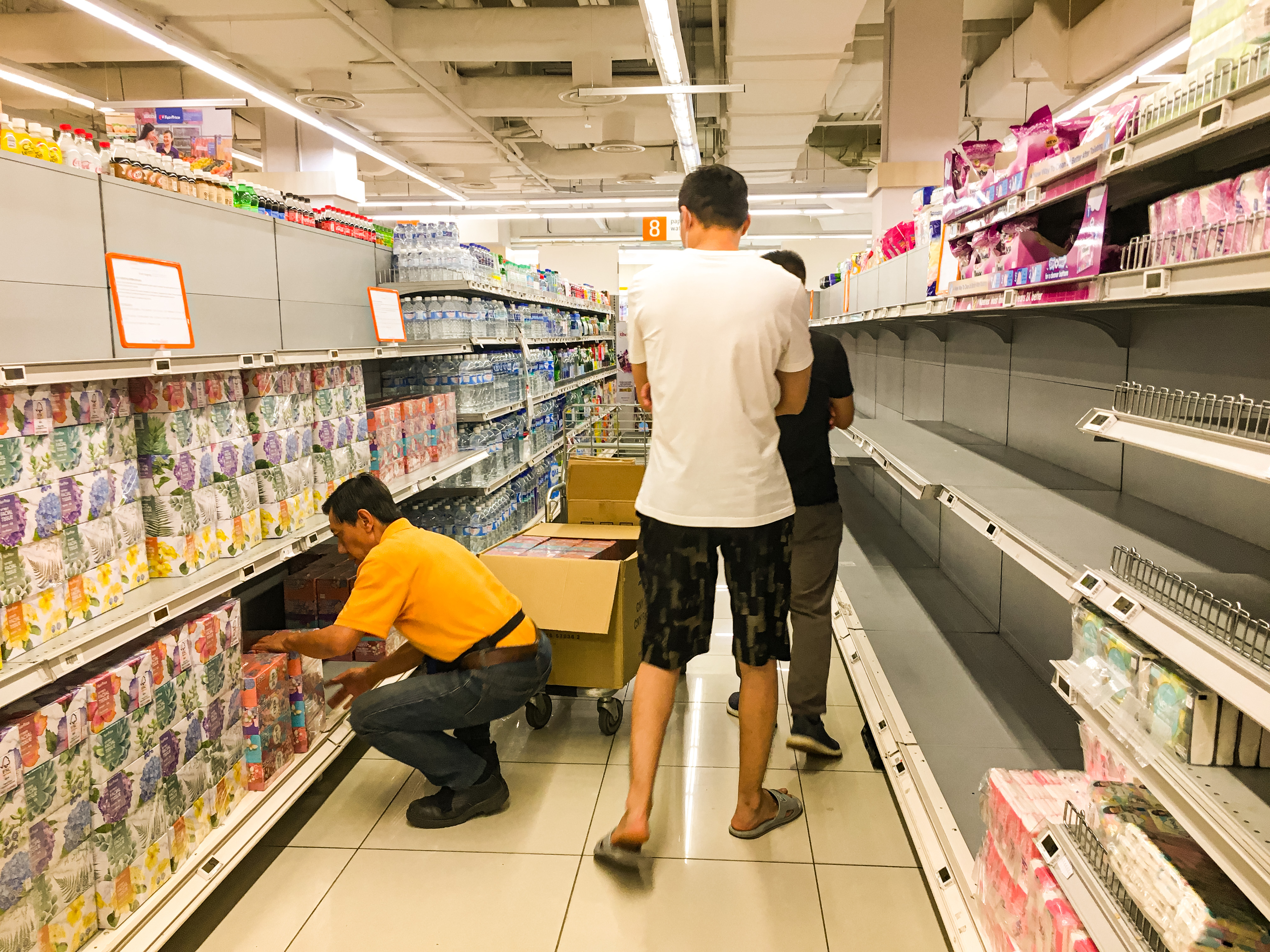
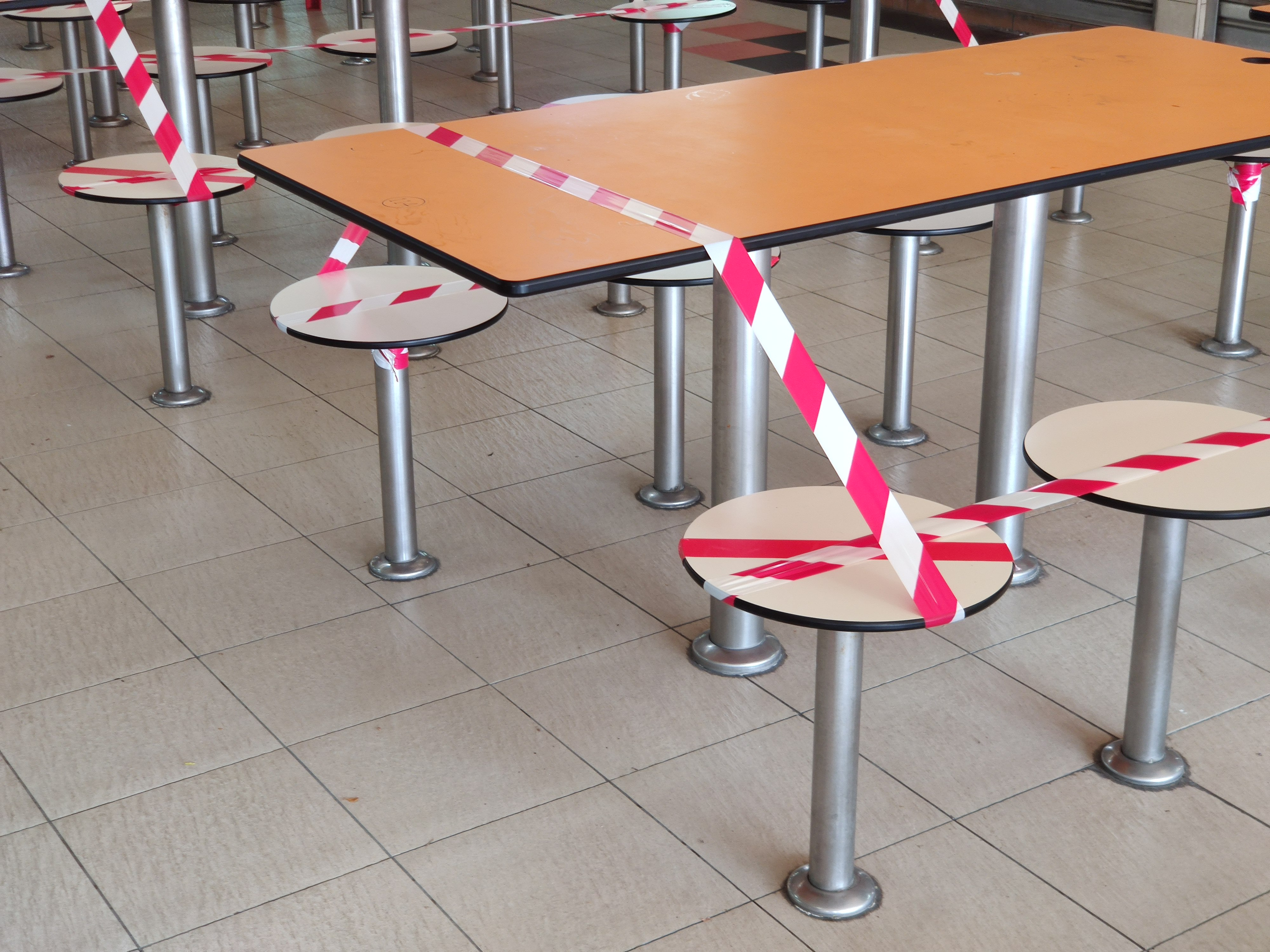
- (clockwise from top left): Marina Bay Sands and ArtScience Museum lit up with messages of hope; Controlled entry into Compass One; Tables and seats cordoned off with tape; Empty shelves at a FairPrice supermarket
- Disease: COVID-19
- Pathogen: SARS-CoV-2
- Location: Singapore
- First reported: Wuhan, Hubei, China
- Index case: Sentosa, Southern Islands
- Arrival date: 23 January 2020 (6 years, 3 months and 3 days)
- Confirmed cases: 3,006,155
- Recovered: 2,516,440 (updated 23 July 2023)
- Deaths: 2,024
- Fatality rate: 0.07%
- Vaccinations: 83% (minimum protection); 46% (up-to-date vaccination)

Government website
- www.moh.gov.sg/COVID-19

The COVID-19 pandemic in Singapore was a part of the worldwide pandemic of coronavirus disease 2019 (COVID-19) caused by severe acute respiratory syndrome coronavirus 2 (SARS-CoV-2). The first case in Singapore was confirmed on 23 January 2020. Early cases were primarily imported until local transmission began to develop in February and March. In late March and April, COVID-19 clusters were detected at multiple migrant worker dormitories, which soon contributed to an overwhelming proportion of new cases in the country.

To stem the tide of infections, strict "circuit breaker" lockdown measures were implemented from 7 April to 1 June 2020, after which restrictions have been gradually lifted as conditions permitted. A mass vaccination campaign was launched, and has been successful in achieving a very high vaccination rate, with more than 96% of the eligible populace having completed their vaccination regimen as of June 2022. Various measures have been taken to mass test the population for the virus and isolate infected people. Contact tracing measures SafeEntry and TraceTogether were implemented to identify and quarantine close contacts of positive cases.

The last record of COVID-19 cases was on 4 June 2023, which was at 2,481,404 confirmed cases, 2,456,295 recoveries and 1,727 deaths, with a case fatality rate of 0.08%, one of the lowest in the world. It introduced what was considered one of the world's largest and best-organised epidemic control programmes.

== Government response ==
1. Unvaccinated population (7.00%)
2. Population who are fully vaccinated (92.0%)
3. Population who have received only one dose of a two-dose vaccine (1.00%)

In response to the emerging threat, a committee known as the "Multi-Ministry Task Force" (often shortened to MMTF) was formed on 22 January 2020, comprising Minister for Education Lawrence Wong, Minister for Health Gan Kim Yong as co-chairs, along with Prime Minister Lee Hsien Loong and Deputy Prime Minister Heng Swee Keat as advisors. On 23 April 2021 in a cabinet reshuffle, Lee announced the appointment of Ong Ye Kung as the new Minister for Health, who would serve in the committee as co-chair alongside the other incumbents. Singapore had also contributed US$500,000 to support the World Health Organization's (WHO) efforts against COVID-19.

=== "Circuit breaker" measures and gradual re-opening ===
In response to the first wave of COVID-19, Singapore enacted the "COVID-19 Control Order", announced on 3 April 2020 a stringent set of preventive measures collectively called the "circuit breaker lockdown". Initially planned to be applied from 7 April to 4 May, the "circuit breaker lockdown" was extended to 1 June on 21 April following continued untraced transmission within the community. The Multi-Ministry Taskforce on 19 May announced the three-phased approach to resume activities safely with the gradual re-opening of economic activities in each phase.

Phase 1 lasted for 17 days from 2 June and ended on 18 June, with Phase 2 lasting for 6 months and 8 days from 19 June to 27 December. Singapore was in Phase 3 from 28 December 2020 until 7 May 2021; following the rise of the Delta variant, it temporarily reverted to Phase 2 on 8 May, which was raised to "Phase 2 Heightened Alert" from 16 May to 13 June, "Phase 3 Heightened Alert" from 14 June to 21 July and "Phase 2 Heightened Alert" from 22 July 2021 to 9 August 2021. This was followed by "Preparatory Stage of Transition" from 10 August 2021 to 26 September 2021, reverting to Phase 2 Heightened Alert measures (dubbed the "Stabilisation Phase") from 27 September to 21 November 2021, after which it entered the "Transition Phase" from 22 November 2021 to 25 April 2022, followed by the "COVID-19 Resilient Nation/Acute Phase" from 26 April 2022 to 12 February 2023.

As of 13 February 2023, Singapore is currently in the "Endemic Phase", with the vast majority of COVID-19 restrictions lifted.

=== Contact tracing technologies ===
Technological solutions to facilitate contact tracing efforts were rapidly developed and deployed by the government. SafeEntry, a check-in system that logs the entry and exit of visitors to public places, was first introduced at selected wet markets on 24 April 2020 and subsequently expanded to include a wide range of venues in May. It was later augmented by compulsory use of TraceTogether, a system originally launched on 20 March 2020 that uses Bluetooth signal strengths to track the proximity and duration of encounters between people with a smartphone app or physical token. With the relaxation of most countermeasures on 26 April 2022, both systems were phased out except in the case of large events with 500 participants, food and beverages outlets, and nightlife entertainment establishments with dancing facilities. On 9 February 2023, it was announced that the use of TraceTogether and SafeEntry would be discontinued from 13 February.

=== Vaccination campaign ===
A mass vaccination programme is currently under way following the approval and acquisition of the Pfizer–BioNTech and Moderna COVID-19 vaccines; in late 2021, Singapore became the world's most-vaccinated country, with more than 85% of its total population fully-vaccinated. As of June 2022, over 92% of the total population have completed their vaccination regimen, representing over 96% of the eligible populace.

== Epidemiology ==
=== Background ===
On 31 December 2019, health authorities in China reported to the World Health Organization (WHO) a cluster of viral pneumonia cases of unknown cause in Wuhan, Hubei, and an investigation was launched in early January 2020. On 30 January, the WHO declared the outbreak a Public Health Emergency of International Concern (PHEIC), after mounting evidence that the novel coronavirus had spread to 18 countries and completion of investigation in Wuhan.

=== Cases ===
Throughout the COVID-19 pandemic, cases were traced to clusters that several cases had visited during a particular time period in the whole of Singapore. In 2020, new cases are only at foreign worker dormitories and construction sites while Singapore had followed zero-COVID strategy. while local cases formed the bulk of new cases from April 2021, driven by SARS-CoV-2 Delta variant, and rose rapidly to 4-digit numbers. At the final recording dated 31 January 2023, there were 2,124,199 local cases and 92,911 imported cases. (Note: From 10 January 2022, dormitory cases were re-classified together with community cases under "local cases" on the MOH website.) 22 February 2022 saw its highest daily count at 26,032 cases, with 24 February 2022 seeing its highest active case count at 73,540 cases; 20 October 2021, 16 November 2021 and 4 March 2022 saw its highest daily fatality count at 18 deaths. The last recorded date of any patient in the ICU was 12 February 2023. It was only on 14 August 2020 that there were no reported community cases for the first time since June, while 1 October 2020 was the first time since April that the daily number of imported cases exceeded that of dormitory cases. 13 October 2020 was the first time in over six months that no dormitory cases were reported, with 15 June 2021 being the first time in over eleven months that no imported cases were reported. At the end of September 2021, the number of confirmed cases in Singapore exceeded the number of confirmed cases in China, with the country also reaching the first grim milestone of 100,000 cases on 2 October 2021. The total number of community cases exceeded that of dormitory cases on 14 October 2021, and passed 100,000 cases on 27 October 2021. Singapore also broke its monthly death record in October 2021 with 312 deaths, breaking its previous monthly death record of 40 in September 2021. The total death count exceeded 1,000 on 27 February 2022, with the total case count crossing the 1-million mark on 19 March 2022. Singapore reported its first death of a patient under 12 years old on 27 June 2022.

Internationally, the case fatality ratio (CFR) for COVID-19 has been much lower than SARS in 2003. The transmission of the SARS-CoV-2 virus powering the COVID-19 pandemic has been significantly greater, with a significant total death toll. However, Singapore's death rate has been one of the world's lowest, both in terms of CFR and per capita. This may be attributed to the fact that the bulk of the cases are restricted to the migrant workers living in dormitories away from the general population. These migrant workers tend to be younger, with an average age of 30 years and 2 months old when surveyed in 2015, and the healthcare system was never overwhelmed. The authorities also tested the entire dormitory population for COVID-19 infection, leading to many otherwise asymptomatic infections being picked up. Research by the European Commission suggests that the CFR for SARS-CoV-2 virus picks up in cases 50 years of age and above. The elderly in the general population in Singapore have been advised to stay at home as much as possible, while resident-facing staff in old folks homes are being housed on site or separately in hotels.

Other factors contributing to Singapore's exceptionally low CFR include the country's use of extensive contact tracing and testing to identify cases, mandatory mask-wearing, and hospitalisation of all high-risk patients. Singapore has comparatively strict criteria for classifying COVID-19 deaths, counting patients who were infected with COVID but died of other causes as non-COVID deaths.

Prevalence studies on the population have shown that 4 in 1600 in the community, or about 0.25%, have previously been infected with COVID-19, while at least 47% of migrant workers living in dormitories have tested positive by PCR or serological tests.

==== Initial wave of COVID-19 (2020) ====
National authorities began reporting suspected cases on 4 January, however the first confirmed case was reported on 23 January, a tourist from Wuhan. Until 30 January, there were a total of 13 confirmed cases, all of whom were visitors to Singapore from China. The first case involving a Singaporean was confirmed on 31 January after returning from Wuhan. Contact tracing procedures were put in place to identify close contacts of the confirmed cases who were placed under 14-day quarantines to ring-fence the potential spread of the virus.

These imported cases eventually lead to clusters of local transmissions being formed. The first local cluster was reported on 4 February at Yong Thai Hang, a Chinese health products shop. It was identified as the locus of the infection where four women without recent history of travel to China contracted the virus. The shop was affected when a tour group from Guangxi, China visited it along with other locations such as the Diamond Industries Jewellery Company at Harbour Drive, where another case occurred, while touring Singapore. The tour group had returned to China and the Chinese authorities had confirmed that two of the group was infected. Authorities raised the DORSCON level to Orange with the impending COVID-19 cases of infection, with Prime Minister Lee expressing his worry about some cases with no known chain of transmission of the infection directly from Wuhan or indirectly via cases traced in Singapore. He suggested that it might become "futile to try to trace every contact". More clusters emerged at various locations, where there were large scale gatherings such as a business conference, Chinese New Year dinner gatherings and church-related activities. Two clusters were linked when several cases in each cluster was found to have infected each other through serological tests, the first such successful test in the world.

In March, as the number of cases began to rise exponentially around the world, the Ministry of Foreign Affairs (MFA) and the Ministry of Education (MOE) began to encourage Singaporeans to return home. Various institutes of higher learning recalled their students currently on overseas internship or exchange, and the MFA began liaising with airlines to facilitate flights to key cities when necessary during this period, to cater to demand for return flights to Singapore. This led to an increase in number of imported cases, in which over 70% of cases from 16 to 19 March were Singaporeans and long-term pass holders returning from overseas.

Plans for the lockdown began in February but waited until late of March. Various mask-off activities were prohibited such as dining in and all exercise activities and many people were remote working starting from early April; from 5 May till 1 June, gatherings and social visits were only allowed up to two per day. The bulk of cases began to shift from imported cases to migrant workers living in dormitories, resulting in the authorities imposing a mandatory quarantine of 20,000 migrant workers in two dormitories gazetted as isolation areas, namely the S11 Dormitory and Westlite Toh Guan. Following which, the number of cases in migrant worker dormitories began to soar as more clusters were detected in other migrant worker dormitories, reaching a single-daily high of 1,426 cases recorded amongst migrant workers on 20 April. On 21 April, the Ministry of Manpower (MOM) announced that all foreign workers in dormitories were to stop work until 4 May to curb the rising spread of COVID-19 among the groups that were hit the hardest. The number of daily cases amongst migrant workers living in dormitories gradually decreased but continued to remain in the hundreds until early August, with aggressive testing by the authorities. April also marked a shift in policy. The government stopped automatically admitting the infected in hospitals and instead created community care facilities for those who were at low risk, which allowed hospitals to focus only on those in higher risk categories. At the peak on 12 May, there were 19,667 patients in community care facilities. This allowed hospitals to reduce bed take up related to COVID-19 from more than a thousand to several hundred in a few weeks. 18 September saw the first time since the crisis spread to work dormitories that the daily dorm case number fell into single digits.

From May onwards, the vast majority of cases were reported in dormitories, with community cases never rising above 24 cases, which was reported on 11 July. Nevertheless, while numbers in the dorms remained elevated in May, 20 April in fact represented the peak of daily cases reported among dormitory workers. By August, it was clear that the situation in dormitories was being brought under control, with new daily cases among dorm workers finally falling below 100 on 11 August. On 11 August, Ministry of Manpower announced that all dormitories had been declared cleared of COVID-19 (except for those blocks that were being used for quarantine facilities). By 1 October less than 300 people were being housed in community care facilities, down from the almost 20,000 from the May peak. However, it also became clear that controlling the disease was going to be extremely difficult. While total case numbers had continued to decline, unlinked community cases had begun to edge up and some dorms that had been cleared of infection were once again put on lockdown. A significant milestone was achieved on 13 October when it was announced that, for the first time since March, there were no local cases of infection. This was followed shortly by 16 October, when the number of active cases fell to less than 100 – the first time since 12 March, and by 25 November, when it was announced that there were no active clusters for the first time since the pandemic began.

On 24 December, Singapore confirmed its first case of the Alpha variant. With Singapore entering the COVID 2020 Phase 3 on 31 December 2020, 2 new clusters were formed out of the 5 community cases reported that day, all of whom were linked to the marine sector. Two additional clusters were formed on 17 and 19 January 2021; the first was from 2 community cases linked to a para-vet working with the Singapore Police Force's K-9 unit, with the second from 2 community cases linked to a worker at Golden Bridge Foods Manufacturing. Another cluster consisting of four community cases linked to an employee at BS Industrial & Construction Supply was formed on 20 January.

After banning short term arrivals in March, imported cases fell dramatically. However, since the beginning of July, there was a steady trickle of imported cases as the government loosened arrival requirements, with the majority of cases arriving from India, Indonesia, and the Philippines. January 2021 saw a sharp spike in imported cases, of which foreign domestic workers formed the bulk due to the high demand for them amidst the pandemic.

==== Delta wave of COVID-19 (2021) ====
On 23 April 2021, Singapore tightened restrictions due to the rising Delta wave of COVID-19. 2 new localised clusters were identified on 21 and 24 April; the first was a household cluster of 3 community cases linked to a 43-year-old Indian national and work pass holder who was possibly re-infected, while the second was involved a 45-year-old permanent resident whose parents had travelled to India On 29 April, a new household cluster was formed out of 7 community cases that were linked to a 38-year-old Singaporean ICA officer working at Changi Airport, with another cluster formed out of 8 community cases linked to a 46-year-old Filipino nurse working at Tan Tock Seng Hospital. It was announced that Singapore would temporarily revert to Phase 2 from 8 May, but because of the rising Delta variant at Changi Airport Terminal 3, Jurong East (Jem) and several institutes of education, it was tightened to Phase 2 Heightened Alert from 16 May to 13 June. Dining-in would no longer be allowed, and the maximum number of persons in a social gathering would be further reduced to two, among other restrictions. MOE also announced that all Singapore primary schools, secondary schools and junior colleges were to move to full home-based learning starting on 19 May.

After a decline in community cases, it was announced that Singapore would re-enter "Phase 3 Heightened Alert", with re-opening to commence in two stages. The first stage would begin on 14 June with the limit on social gatherings increased to 5 people, while the next stage would begin on 21 June with the resumption of dining-in with 5 people. MOE further announced that Primary 4–6, Secondary 3–5, and junior college and Millennia Institute students would be able to return to school on 28 June, and Secondary 1–2 students on 1 July; all students from other levels would return on 6 July. However, a new cluster was formed at the 115 Bukit Merah View Market and Food Centre that was linked to a 74-year old store owner who tested positive on 9 June, which resulted in a fresh surge of community cases. Consequently, the second stage of re-opening was adjusted so that only 2 persons would be allowed for dining-in. With the stabilisation of community infections in early July 2021, it was announced that dining-in with groups of up to 5—along with wedding receptions—would resume on 12 July.

In mid-July 2021, a new cluster was formed at several KTV lounges out of 3 community cases linked to a short-term visit pass holder from Vietnam who first tested positive on 11 July, leading to another massive surge in cases. Another new cluster that contributed to the surge was formed on 16 July at Jurong Fishery Port, thereby it reverted to the semi-lockdown called "Phase 2 Heightened Alert" from 22 July to 10 August.

On 6 August 2021, it was announced that due to Singapore having successfully vaccinated 66% of its population, restrictions would be eased in two phases; from 10 August, dining-in at restaurants would resume with a limit of up to 5 fully-vaccinated persons, while the limit for non-vaccinated persons and dining-in at hawker centres would remain at 2. From 19 August, half of employees currently remote working could return to offices. The following weeks saw another steep rise in dormitory and community cases with the formation of new clusters at North Coast Lodge on 23 August and Bugis Junction on 24 August, as well as 8 bus interchanges. In this situation, Singapore has only been able to toggle between 2 and 5 person gatherings and are unable to ease back to 8 person gatherings from 8 May 2021 all the way to 28 March 2022. Singapore has removed restrictions relating to Variant of Concern from 29 March 2022.

Just after Singapore's COVID-19 vaccination rates increased to 80%, cases rose rapidly by 500 - 1,000 on 30 August 2021, after the public feedback, MOH has announced that Singapore will enter the Stabilisation Phase, dining-in group size at F&B outlets are reduced to two vaccinated people from the current five. Singapore has abandoned the zero-COVID strategy. When the situation improved, dining-in were reverted to five persons who are from the same household, then from 22 November, Singapore had entered Transition Phase after two months, dining-in were reverted to five vaccinated persons and hawker centres and coffeeshops joined the five vaccinated persons strategy, if checks took place. The government did not ease any remote work until the introduction of Workforce Vaccination Measures (WVM), those coming back to work were complemented by ART testing on weekends only. In addition, Singapore has changed the "clusters" to "Health Risk Warning (HRW)", where those who are close contact will have to take Antigen Rapid Testing (ART) under Protocol 3, those who took 5-day MC and on self-isolation/quarantine, hence those who are under Protocol 2.

From 1 October 2021, MOH announced that it would unveil COVID-19 maps daily showing where COVID-19 cases have visited frequently. The first map released on 1 October, had 12 sub-zones shown which were frequently visited by infected cases.

==== Omicron waves of COVID-19 (2022) ====
On 4 January 2022, the week-on-week infection increase rate crossed 1 in Singapore. This has happened for the first time in approximately two months since the COVID-19 Omicron variant cases increased in the city-state. As per statistics, most of the cases detected on each day have entered Singapore from abroad, precisely, 502 out of 842 cases. Despite the increase in cases, hospitalization in Singapore has remained low, with more ICU beds available than in use. Following reports that the current wave was subsiding, MOH announced that COVID-19 safety measures would be streamlined, effective from 15 March 2022 onwards. On 29 March 2022, the measures were further eased, with the limit on group sizes and dining-in increased to 10, masks made optional outdoors and the full reopening of borders for fully-vaccinated travellers, as well as the lifting of restrictions on live performances.

On 22 April 2022, MOH announced that due to the stabilising situation, it would lower the DORSCON level to Yellow from 26 April onwards; limits on group sizes would be removed, and TraceTogether and SafeEntry would cease operations at most settings. In addition, the Ministry of Sustainability and the Environment (MSE) announced on 24 April that it would gradually reduce the number of safe-distancing ambassadors on patrol.

On 15 May 2022, three cases in the community were found to be infected with the new BA.4 and BA.5 sub-variants. Health Minister Ong Ye Kung predicted that the next wave would arrive in July or August 2022. As the situation stabilised in late August, it was announced that safety measurements would be further eased, with masks only required for transportation that is meant for public access (e.g. Mass Rapid Transit, Light Rail Transit, Causeway Link, SBS Transit, SMRT Buses, Tower Transit, ComfortDelGro, Strides Transportation, TransCab, Sentosa Express, Changi Airport Skytrain and those shopping mall services) and healthcare facilities; non fully-vaccinated travellers to Singapore would also no longer be required to serve a 7-day SHN.

The first week of October 2022 saw an increase in cases due to the F1 Grand Prix.

On 6 October 2023, Health Minister Ong Ye Kung announced that Singapore was experiencing another COVID-19 infection wave, with the recent spate of cases mostly driven by two variants, EG.5 and its sub-lineage HK.3. Both of these are descendants of the XBB Omicron variant. These two variants accounted for over 75% of the daily cases in Singapore. The estimated daily cases had risen from about 1,000 in the second week of September 2023 to about 2,000 in the following two weeks.

On 22 December 2023, Health Minister Ong Ye Kung indicated that the latest wave of COVID-19 cases in Singapore had possibly peaked and there was therefore no need for additional measures, such as a mask mandate, to be implemented. The seven-day moving average estimated daily number of COVID-19 cases in Singapore had dropped in the days before — it had decreased from 7,730 on 17 December 2023 to 6,820 the following day, and then 6,530 on 19 December 2023.

==== FLiRT waves of COVID-19 (2024) ====
On 18 May 2024, it was reported that there had been a near-doubling of COVID-19 cases from the previous week, with the estimated number of COVID-19 infections increasing from 13,700 to 25,900 week-on-week. The KP.1 and KP.2 strains of the COVID-19 virus accounted for more than two thirds of cases in Singapore at the time. The two strains belong to the FLiRT group of COVID-19 variants, which are descendants of the JN.1 variant.

==== Cautious reopening ====
The authorities took cautious measures as the economy began to reopen to more regular outside travellers in August 2020. Travellers who did not quarantine in a dedicated facility would have to wear an electronic tag throughout the 14-day period. Singapore also implemented a Reciprocal Green Lane (RGL) and Periodic Commuting Arrangement (PCA) with Malaysia, allowing limited travel between the two countries. Later in the month, arrivals from certain countries had their 14-day quarantine reduced to 7 days; those arriving from Brunei and New Zealand who were tested negative upon arrival would be allowed in without any quarantine. On 30 September 2020, the Singapore government announced that the country will lift border restrictions for some visitors from Australia, excluding Victoria state, and Vietnam, beginning from 8 October 2020; quarantine requirements for Victoria state and mainland China were cancelled on 6 November. In October 2020, then-Minister of Transport Ong Ye Kung suggested that Singapore would be looking to open travel bubbles with various countries such as those with similar risk profiles, but also for those countries from higher risk locations. One such travel bubble between Singapore and Hong Kong was to have started on 22 November; initially postponed to 2021 due to the resurgence of COVID-19 cases in Hong Kong, it was eventually cancelled in August 2021 due to conflicting strategies between the city-state. Singapore cancelled the quarantine arrangement for Hong Kong and Macao, allowing all arrivals quarantine-free under the Air Travel Pass (ATP). This came 9 months after Singapore cancelled the quarantine requirement for China.

== Domestic impact ==
=== Legal impact ===
To stop the spread of COVID-19, the COVID-19 (Temporary Measures) Act 2020 and its Control Order Regulations 2020 was brought into force. These rules banned gatherings and led some to be charged in court, fined or even jailed for offences related to these laws. A number of people who were on work passes have had their passes revoked and have also been permanently banned from working in Singapore.

Due to the COVID-19 pandemic, there was an unofficial moratorium on all executions in Singapore for two years, although there are still new death sentences imposed in several capital cases (including convicted murderer Teo Ghim Heng) during the moratorium. The first person to be sentenced to death during the COVID-19 pandemic in Singapore was Punithan Genasan, a 37-year-old Malaysian who was also the first to be sentenced to death on 15 May 2020 via a remote court hearing on video-conferencing platform Zoom. Punithan, who was convicted of drug trafficking, was later acquitted on 31 October 2022 upon appeal. Eventually, the Singapore government carried out its first execution on 30 March 2022 by hanging 68-year-old Singaporean drug trafficker Abdul Kahar Othman, thus ending the city-state's moratorium on capital punishment. So far, 17 executions (11 in 2022, five in 2023 and one in 2024) were carried out as of 28 February 2024. One of them was Saridewi Djamani, the first woman to be executed since 2004 and Ahmed Salim, the first convicted murderer to be hanged since 2019.

After the execution of Ahmed on 28 February 2024, the Singaporean authorities released an official statement and clarified that the COVID-19 pandemic was not the reason behind the two-year pause on executions, but due to the convicts still in the process of appeal or other lawsuits related to their sentences, and the execution could be only be scheduled and carried out once an inmate had exhausted all avenues of appeal available in his case.

Also, as a result of the COVID-19 pandemic (especially during the lockdown), virtual court hearings were made through digital video-conferencing platforms (notably Zoom) to hear court cases, which replaced physical court hearings for some cases. The first fully virtual court hearing was made via Zoom on 23 April 2020, when the Court of Appeal acquitted 27-year-old Mohammad Azli Mohammad Salleh of drug trafficking and overturned his death sentence.

=== Economic impact ===
The pandemic was forecasted to have a significant impact on the local economy. On 17 February 2020, the Ministry of Trade and Industry (MTI) downgraded Singapore's forecast GDP growth to between −0.5% and 1.5%. This is largely due to the fall in tourism and social distancing restrictions. On 26 March, MTI said it believed that the economy would contract by between 1% and 4% in 2020. This was after the economy shrank some 2.2% in the first quarter of 2020 from the same quarter in 2019. On 26 May, the Singapore economy contracted 0.7%YoY, which was better than the expected contraction of 2.2%. However, MTI said that it was revising down its expectation for the Singapore economy in 2020 to shrink by 4% to 7%. Economists were behind the curve in downgrading their numbers. The IMF for example, predicted in October 2019 that growth in 2020 would be 1%, but as a result of COVID-19, had changed their expectation in October 2020 to a contraction of 6%. Other institutions initially expected the economy to expand but had to revise their numbers.

On 2 April 2020, the rating's agency Moody's downgraded the Singapore banking sector from "stable" outlook to a "negative" outlook on the back of rising bad loans and deteriorating profitability as a result of the COVID-19 pandemic. It was estimated by the economist Chua Hak Bin, the lockdown "circuit breaker" beginning on 7 April could impact the economy to the tune of S$10 billion. With the lockdown imposed on foreign workers, there were concerns that there could be delays in construction work of up to six months. Senior Minister of State Chee Hong Tat announced that some 3,800 companies had closed in April 2020, only slightly higher than the 3,700 reported on average for the same month in the past 5 years. Though he warned that this would likely rise in the coming months. Despite this only small increase in companies shutting down, the number of companies starting up had declined by about a third from the average April since 2015.

On 6 April 2020, it was announced in Parliament that Changi Airport Terminal 2 would be suspended from 1 May 2020 for 18 months due to the ongoing pandemic. Terminal 4 would later be suspended on 16 May indefinitely as well, with the aim to restart operations when travel demand returns. The suspension of Terminal 2 would also allow the ongoing expansion work which was announced in January 2020 to be completed up to a year ahead of schedule in 2023 instead of 2024. The airlines which were operating from these two terminals were largely consolidated into the remaining Terminals 1 and 3, with some airlines remained suspended until further notice.

In November 2020, the MTI announced Singapore's economy contracted 5.8% in the third quarter from the same period in 2019. It also expected the economy to shrink contract by between 6% and 6.5% in 2020, though in 2021 it expected an expansion of between 4% and 6% next year.

==== Employment ====
Data released by the Ministry of Manpower showed that total employment contracted by 57,000 in 2020, which was the biggest drop since SARS in 2003. Foreign workers were vulnerable to being let go during the crisis as support measures such as the Jobs Support Scheme were primarily targeted as subsidising the wages of local staff not all employees. There were some 22,200 fewer foreign employees (excluding domestic workers) between December 2019 and March 2020. Ministry of Manpower reported that unemployment in the first quarter of 2020 rose to 2.4 per cent from 2.3 per cent the quarter previously, the highest in a decade, while among Singaporeans it rose from 3.3 per cent to 3.5 per cent.

As a result of the COVID-19 pandemic, various companies like Resorts World Sentosa reduced a significant amount of its workforce.

Local firms had to take aggressive action to deal with effects of the pandemic. For example, on 10 September 2020, Singapore Airlines announced that it would cut around 4,300 positions across its group. On 15 September 2020, United Overseas Bank announced that it was limiting hiring.

==== Inflation ====
The overall inflation dropped to 0.3% in February 2020 on a year-by-year basis. Core inflation, which excludes the costs of accommodation and private road transport, dropped to −0.1%, the first time this decade that core inflation turned negative. This was also due to supply chains being disrupted due to COVID-19.

==== Stocks ====
On 9 March 2020, the Straits Times Index fell 6.03% owing to the impact of COVID-19, made worse by the oil price war. The Index dropped again three days later by 3.8% after more measures were announced with the World Health Organization declaring a pandemic.

==== Monetary policy ====
The Monetary Authority of Singapore (MAS) brought forward its twice year meeting from some time in April to 30 March 2020. The MAS has since decided to ease the Singapore dollar's appreciation rate to zero per cent, as well as adjust the policy band downwards, the first such move since the 2008 financial crisis. This makes it the first time the MAS had taken these two measures together. Unusually, on 6 April, the central bank also announced that it would bring forward its disclosure of foreign exchange intervention to 9 April. It was previously scheduled to be published in June. In September, Citi argued that a downward re-centring for the Singapore dollar nominal effective exchange rate (S$NEER) in October 2020 could still take place.

=== Tourism industry ===
As one of the industries greatly affected by the pandemic, tourism in Singapore had fallen, with the Singapore Tourism Board only just welcoming its largest increase in visitor arrivals the year preceding the outbreak. As with virtually every other country, travel restrictions were imposed on Singapore by several countries. In response, Prime Minister Lee Hsien Loong encouraged Singaporeans to go on a local 'staycation' to mitigate the fall in demand for tourism. The retail sector was also affected due to a large reliance in spending from tourists, though it had been steadily recovering since the transition to Phase 3. The Connect@Singapore initiative, which allows short-term stays for the purposes for business travel, was announced in December 2020 by the Ministry of Trade and Industry (MTI) and launched on 1 April 2021 in an attempt to revitalise the nation's airline and hospitality sectors by re-opening borders safely.

On 8 May 2021, the UK announced that it would allow people in England to resume international travel from 17 May, but would limit the number of destinations open for quarantine-free holidays to just a handful of countries as it cautiously eases lockdown restrictions. Singapore was amongst the select few countries which made the list for such travel, in a system that will be reviewed every three weeks.

=== Air travel bubbles (ATB) ===
The first of several bilateral quarantine-free travel schemes launched by the government was the "air travel bubble", in which both countries agree to allow quarantine-free travel strictly between the two.

==== With New Zealand and Brunei ====
On 1 September 2020, applications for "green lane" travel bubbles for travellers from New Zealand and Brunei were opened. Visitors from those 2 countries would be required to take a COVID-19 test on arrival at Changi Airport and self-isolate until they received a negative test result, but otherwise did not have to stay in quarantine upon arrival in Singapore. This was provided they have remained in the country for the last consecutive 14 days prior to their visit to Singapore.

Following a resurgence in COVID-19 cases in Singapore, Brunei suspended its "green lane" travel bubble on 20 May 2021. In August 2021, it was announced that Singapore's would launch its first quarantine-free travel lanes for vaccinated passengers from Brunei and Germany on 8 September.

==== With Hong Kong ====
On 11 November 2020, Hong Kong and Singapore agreed to launch a "travel bubble" to kickstart tourism between the countries without a need to quarantine. It was hoped that having a quarantine-free travel would boost tourism and business between the two Asian hubs cities, though anyone travelling between the two cities was required to have a valid negative test result for COVID-19 before their flight. The travel bubble was scheduled to start on 22 November 2020. However, the day before the launch, both cities announced that it would be deferred by two weeks until early December, in response to a sudden spike in new infections in Hong Kong. On 1 December, the launch date was deferred again to beyond December 2020. On 14 December, Singapore increased Hong Kong's quarantine duration to 14 days, up from the previous 7 day arrangement. This showed the complexities involved in opening up, even between countries which had coronavirus infections under control. On 29 March 2021, Singapore resumed discussions with Hong Kong after the latter city experienced a significant decline in its daily local COVID-19 cases. On 26 April, both Singapore and Hong Kong confirmed that the air travel bubble would officially re-launch on 26 May. However, after a spike in local infections triggered fresh restrictions in Singapore in late April, Singapore's government stated on 6 May that it would assess any potential changes to the travel bubble. It was eventually announced in August 2021 that the travel bubble would be cancelled, though quarantine requirements for travellers from Hong Kong and Macao would be cancelled on 26 August. This also came 9 months after Singapore had cancelled the quarantine requirement for arrivals from China. Tourists from Hong Kong and Macao who have spent three consecutive weeks in those cities could apply to enter Singapore under the Air Travel Pass. They also would not need to quarantine if they test negative on arrival and isolate themselves until the test results are available.

=== Air Travel Pass (ATP) ===
Singapore introduced the Air Travel Pass (ATP) in late 2020, which is the predecessor to the Vaccinated Travel Lane (VTL) only introduced in 2021. It allowed all travellers who have stayed in specific regions to enter quarantine-free regardless of vaccination status.

The ATP was given to China, Hong Kong, Macau, Taiwan, and Victoria State (Australia) due to the low cases in the region. Hong Kong received it after the travel bubble was cancelled in August 2021. However, Hong Kong's ATP was later cancelled in early 2022 and replaced with the VTL (tightening restrictions), while China, Macau, and Taiwan retained the ATP until Singapore retired the VTL and allowed all vaccinated travellers to enter without being on a designated flight.

=== Vaccinated Travel Lane (VTL) ===
As part of Singapore's efforts to reopen its borders safely, fully-vaccinated Singaporean citizens and permanent residents would now be allowed to return to Singapore via the Vaccinated Travel Lane (VTL). On 9 October 2021, it was announced that Singapore would open up more VTLs with other countries, including South Korea and the United States. On 24 March 2022, the Civil Aviation Authority of Singapore (CAAS) announced the retirement of all VTLs and the reopening of borders to all vaccinated travellers from 1 April 2022.

==== With Germany and Brunei ====
Singapore announced that it would be opening a new VTL arrangement for fully-vaccinated travellers from Germany and Brunei from 8 September 2021. Under this arrangement, travellers could enter Singapore without the need to serve a SHN upon arrival. Instead, they would undergo multiple COVID-19 polymerase chain reaction (PCR) tests during their stay in Singapore.

==== With Malaysia ====
On 8 November 2021, Prime Minister Lee Hsien Loong and Malaysia PM Ismail Sabri Yaakob announced the launch of a VTL between Singapore Changi Airport and Kuala Lumpur International Airport from 29 November 2021.

Subsequently, both nations agreed to a phased opening of a second VTL through the Johor–Singapore Causeway beginning on 29 November 2021 using designated bus lanes, marking the reopening of the land border between the two countries since its closure in March 2020. Only citizens, permanent residents (PRs) and long-term pass holders of the country they are visiting were allowed to access this VTL scheme. The second phase, which would allow citizens of both countries to travel between them, began on 20 December 2021.

==== With Sweden and Finland ====
Singapore included Sweden and Finland in its quarantine-free travel-lane programmes, which came into effect on 29 November 2021.

==== With Indonesia, India and the Gulf States ====
On 15 November 2021, Singapore announced plans to establish VTLs with Indonesia and India from 29 November 2021. Singapore also plans to expand the VTL scheme to Qatar, Saudi Arabia and the United Arab Emirates from 6 December 2021. From 16 March 2022, Singapore will open VTL access to all Indian cities. Following reports of the circulation of the new Omicron variant, the planned VTLs with the Gulf States was deferred; it was later announced that they would be launched on 25 February 2022. Bi-directional quarantine-free sea travel between Singapore and Indonesia would also resume.

==== With Hong Kong ====
A VTL between Singapore and Hong Kong was launched on 25 February 2022, due to the rise in cases. It differs from other VTLs as this was one-way; Hong Kong still imposed a quarantine on all arrivals. This VTL actually tightened restrictions as the previous arrangement, the Air Travel Pass (ATP), allowed all arrivals to enter Singapore quarantine-free regardless of vaccination status.

== Societal impact ==
=== Local shopping ===
The retail industry has been significantly affected by the COVID-19 pandemic, together with the food industry. Foot traffic at shopping malls had dropped, with some shops choosing to shorten their opening hours or face massive closures like Esprit Holdings, Isetan Westgate, Liang Court, H&M Tampines Mall, Topshop, Robinsons and Hotwind.

Local shopping malls saw a decline at the very start of the pandemic in early 2020, but by late February 2020, CapitaLand reported that foot traffic at malls were almost back to normal, before being reduced in late-March to early-April 2020 due to the implementation of "circuit breaker" measures. Retail sales fell during the COVID-19 pandemic from March to June, citing the "circuit breaker" measures as reasons. The April and May figure was the worst since records began in 1986. However, retail sales reinstated gradually in July, August and September but the process was interrupted by public places visited by cases in the community. Foot traffic will again resume back to normal fully once Singapore moves to Phase 3. Retail sales and foot traffic again fell during Phase 2 (Heightened Alert) from 3 May 2021 to 14 June 2021.

Because of this, several tenants pushed for rental rebates, citing significant drops in revenue. This was eventually implemented by several malls, including Jewel Changi Airport and CapitaLand-owned malls. Suntec City also announced that it would waive the rent for all tenants for the month of April, May and June in 2020. The National Environment Agency (NEA) also implemented rent waivers and rebates for all stallholders in hawker centres operated by NEA or NEA-appointed operators.

In addition, the Great Singapore Sale was moved online, called e-GSS.

=== Panic buying and price gouging ===
Panic buying and price gouging of personal protective equipment (PPEs) such as face masks began with the first confirmed case of COVID-19 in Singapore on 23 January 2020. By 24 January, both N95 and surgical masks had run out at retail outlets. This has prompted local retailers including NTUC FairPrice, Watsons and Guardian to originally impose purchase limits. In many areas, people began wearing of masks; but on 1 April, the number of people wearing masks had increased to 93%, with masks made mandatory by the government on 14 April. In addition, mask wearing continues to remain until the pandemic has subsided to endemic levels, with the gradual easing of masks done only in the safest outdoor and common housing environment first. The first phase of mask easing which includes outdoors settings came into force on 29 March 2022. The second and final phase of mask easing comes on 29 August 2022; which involves the remaining settings.

The shortage of masks and other PPEs has caused many retailers to engage in profiteering by price gouging and scalping. This included both local brick-and-mortar stores as well as retailers on e-commerce platforms. The government has applauded platforms Carousell and Qoo10 for threatening to suspend profiteers. The governmental price controller has also issued warnings to retailers who engage in price gouging and requested information from e-commerce platforms on potential profiteers.

Panic buying and hoarding of essentials such as rice, instant noodles and toilet paper occurred with the raising of the DORSCON level from yellow to orange on 7 February 2020, with empty shelves at supermarkets within hours. Local supermarket chain NTUC FairPrice imposed limits on the amount of essentials each consumer can buy, with these limits initially set for paper products, rice products, instant noodle packets and vegetables. NTUC FairPrice and Dairy Farm Singapore announced that it would introduce specific hours for those members of the community who were more vulnerable such as Pioneer Generation members. Following the review, supermarkets are considered essential services, therefore there is no need to hoard items, it must be opened every day.

A second wave of panic buying and hoarding occurred on 17 March when Malaysia announced its Movement Control Order (MCO) from 18 March, sparked by fears of food shortages. The government clarified that the flow of goods, cargo and food supplies between Singapore and Malaysia would continue, urging the public to avoid panic buying. They added that Singapore had diverse sources of essential goods and was not facing an immediate shortage of food or essentials. NTUC FairPrice has expanded its list of items that are limited per consumer to include eggs, vegetables and poultry. 10 days later, NTUC FairPrice expanded its list to include canned food, cooking oil and frozen meat, with reduced purchasing limits for paper products.

To deal with the massive increase in online shopping orders, local e-commerce platform RedMart on 2 April said that it would prioritise daily essentials such as milk powder, flour, eggs and rice while limiting orders to 35 items and reducing its range of goods to focus on the essentials. It also said that it would stop taking orders until 4 April to implement additional measures.

Ahead of tighter measures on 7 April, shoppers queued at shopping malls despite government requests for people to remain at home.

Egg distributors were reporting in June that they now had an oversupply of eggs and were throwing away supplies or culling laying stock.

=== Events and mass gatherings ===
As a result of COVID-19 pandemic, many event organisers and organisations, including places of worship have switched events virtually with more than 250 persons and moving on to 50 persons in the second phase. These include COMEX, IT Show, PC Show and SITEX. Thaipusam processions had carried on but with up to 500 persons in 2020.

Mediacorp postponed its Star Awards ceremony to 2021 and held it at Jewel Changi Airport due to the COVID-19 pandemic. The Shangri-La Dialogue defence summit, which had been held every year in Singapore, was cancelled during the COVID-19 pandemic. On 12 June 2020, it was announced that the Singapore Grand Prix, would be cancelled in both 2020 and 2021. Organisers of the Marina Bay Singapore Countdown had announced on 5 November 2020 that there will be no fireworks display and countdown at Marina Bay, instead, light shows will be held instead together with heartland fireworks and that the event would be streamed online and on television by Mediacorp.

On 7 December 2020, organisers of the annual World Economic Forum event announced that they have decided to hold its 2021 annual meeting in Singapore, from 25 to 28 May, instead of its traditional home of Switzerland, which is battling a rising number of coronavirus infections. On 3 February 2021, the organisers postponed the annual meeting to 17–20 August due to pandemic-related challenges. It was eventually cancelled on 17 May, with the World Economic Forum's (WEF) citing global uncertainties caused by COVID-19 as the reason. It was added that the next annual meeting will take place in the first half of 2022, with the final location and date to be decided later.

On 4 May 2021, the President's Office announced that the Istana Open House on 13 May would be cancelled. While it was initially announced that it would reopen on 1 August, it was later decided that the event would be postponed to 28 August, in the wake of the rise of community cases in July.

On 30 June 2021, Ng Eng Hen announced that the annual National Day Parade at The Float @ Marina Bay would proceed as planned. Following the return to Phase 2 (Heightened Alert), MINDEF stated that it would be postponed to 21 August, with a ceremonial parade held on 9 August. On 12 July 2022, it was announced that live performances and open houses would return to the Istana.

Wedding ceremonies were also adversely affected by COVID-19. In Risk Level 0 (Heightened Risk), all wedding receptions are not allowed. In Risk Level 1, it was allowed with up to 50 persons without pre-event testing and 250 persons with pre-event testing. In Risk Level 2, it was allowed with up to 100 persons without pre-event testing and 250 persons with pre-event testing. Wedding ceremonies were revamped since the return to P2HA in 2021, to allow wedding receptions for all fully vaccinated persons, up to 100 guests, before raising back to 250 guests.

=== Transportation ===
Taxi and private hire vehicles were hit by the impact of COVID-19. A S$77 million package was provided to help them tide through this period, co-funded by the Government, taxi and private-hire companies. In addition, a S$2.7 million fund was set up by the Government and National Trades Union Congress (NTUC) for drivers who are not eligible. In view of the worsening coronavirus impact, the package will be enhanced from May 2020, extending until September 2020. This will cost an additional $95 million. On 6 April, directors of the ComfortDelGro Group announced its board of directors would take a voluntary 20 per cent cut in directors' fees until the end of 2020.

Various banks have suggested that Singapore Airlines will have a loss in FY21, with OCBC credit analysts arguing that the airline will have to tap the markets for more funds and possibly even need state support.

Singapore Airlines Group, consisting of Singapore Airlines (SIA), SilkAir and Scoot, also announced plans to slash their capacity. Singapore Airlines slashed nearly all of the capacity until August. The news resulted in STI crashing down by 164.63 (6.83%). Scoot did likewise, grounding 47 out of the 49 planes they had in their fleet at the time. It was reported on 27 March 2020, SIA received a rescue package of S$19 billion (US$13 billion). Its major shareholder Temasek Holdings helped underwrite the package, containing S$5.3 billion of equity and S$9.7 billion of convertible notes. Singapore's largest bank, DBS Bank, also extended a loan of S$4 billion to help it get over the crisis and position itself for expansion. With the significant reduction in flights, Singapore Airlines agreed to provide some 300 staff to help with possible manpower shortages at hospitals in Singapore and provided some staff to deal with transport ambassadors. It was announced that the airline would consolidate all their Changi Airport operations from 1 May 2020 to Terminal 3. On 14 May 2020, Singapore Airlines announced a full year loss for Financial Year 2019–2020 of S$212 million, which the group's first loss in its 48 years of operation. On 1 September 2020, Singapore Airlines announced plans to reinstate several destinations that have opened up travel such as Bandar Seri Begawan, Auckland, Christchurch, Taipei, Hong Kong, Macau, Hanoi, Brisbane, Perth and Sydney. For airlines, regulations for social distancing are not applicable to save costs. Mask wearing continues to be mandatory and airlines will upgrade their apps to include contact tracing. Overnight flights will also be re-introduced which allows even quieter rides. On 25 June Jetstar Asia announced that it was cutting up to 180 people, almost a quarter of the workforce in Singapore. At the same time they would allow the retirement of five of their A320 fleet, bringing the total down to 13.

The Land Transport Authority announced that bidding of all certificates of entitlement (COEs) during the COVID-19 lockdown periods would be suspended.

Transport services were gradually reduced in stages. Last train timings were brought forward earlier, and transport frequencies were retained to allow safe distancing. Measures also involved the imposition of queuing at MRT station exit doors.

Cross-border bus services were impacted by Malaysia's Movement Control Order all the way until 30 April 2022, with services 160 and 170 that cross the Causeway to be amended to serve only local sectors of its route, while other services that were specific for the border crossing such as 170X and 950 were suspended entirely.

Bus services also experienced disruptions when clusters of COVID-19 infection occurred among public bus drivers, forcing both patients and colleagues who were close contacts to self-isolate. In August and September 2021, "slightly under 10%" out of a total of 9,500 bus drivers were affected, resulting in some express services being withdrawn, while waiting times increased for other routes that had to run at a reduced frequency. Bus operators sought to minimize the impact by prioritising high-demand routes, reassigning available drivers as needed. In February 2022, another shortage of drivers occurred due to a wave of infections, and SBS Transit was forced to reduce the operating frequency of some routes, with double-decker buses deployed to replace single-deckers in some instances to compensate for capacity.

The quarantine and testing of all foreign workers in dormitories had also caused delays in the construction of various MRT projects, which was cited as a reason for the delay of the Thomson–East Coast line Stage 2 which was further delayed to 28 August 2021. The Land Transport Authority (LTA) later reported that they had yet to fully assess the length of delay on the other stages of the line as well as other ongoing projects.

=== Scams ===
There had also been a number of reports of individuals that capitalised on the pandemic to engage in online scams. In one instance, scammers pretended to be Ministry of Health (MOH) officials engaging in contact tracing, which prompted the MOH and Singapore Police Force (SPF) to clarify that no financial details or transfer of money will be requested during contact tracing. Several people were also arrested for face masks sold over the online e-commerce platform Carousell that were never fulfilled. On 4 April 2020, SPF also arrested a man for suspected money-laundering offences amounting to S$10.3 million over the purchase of surgical masks and hand sanitisers that were never fulfilled.

The Ministry of Social and Family Development (MSF) and SPF were investigating possible abuses of the COVID-19 Temporary Relief Fund (TRF), which is supposed to provide financial assistance to those eligible. A total of 394 COVID-19-related scams occurred between January and April 2020, with losses totalling S$1.4 million.

In 2021, SPF started distributing a warning about a new type of scam involving oxygen machines. The scammers reportedly exploited compromised WhatsApp accounts to solicit donations for the purchase of oxygen concentrator machines to be sent to India.

== International relations ==
=== Stranded Malaysia-based workers ===
On 16 March 2020, the Malaysian government announced the start of the Movement Control Order (MCO) that took effect on 18 March 2020, preventing Malaysians that were staying in Singapore at the time, many of which were also working in Singapore, from leaving the country. With approximately 300,000 Malaysians, or almost a tenth of Singapore's labour force working in Singapore, the MCO would have been expected to significantly affect Singapore's economy, including sectors providing essential services.

The announcement of the MCO resulted in long queues at immigration checkpoints as Malaysian workers in Singapore scrambled to collect their belongings and return to Singapore, while Singaporeans returned home. Various firms across Singapore rushed to find temporary accommodation for their workers before the MCO took effect. The Singapore government advised workers to try to stay with relatives, friends, and colleagues, and seek housing in hotels, dormitories and rental flats if this was not possible. The government also provided $50 for each worker per day, up to 14 days to support employers finding accommodation. As of 17 March, the government announced that 10,000 Malaysian workers had been matched with temporary housing. Some workers could not immediately find accommodations and resorted to sleeping in public areas. In response, Ministry of Social and Family Development repurposed Jurong East Sports Hall into a temporary relief area for remaining Malaysian workers who were unable to find temporary accommodations immediately after the MCO took effect, while the Ministry of Manpower stepped up patrols to look out for such stranded workers. A number of residents also stepped up to offer their spare rooms to accommodate Malaysian workers at little to no cost.

The MCO resulted in the suspension of all bus services between Johor Bahru and Singapore. While the KTMB Shuttle Tebrau train service continued to operate between the two checkpoints, only citizens returning to their respective countries are allowed to board. The lockdown also sparked fears of food shortages, triggering a second wave of panic buying and hoarding of essential items. On 26 April, Malaysia announced that Malaysians wanting to return to Malaysia will need to obtain permits from the Malaysian High Commission in Singapore. However, only 400 of such permits were issued daily.

=== Border controls and operations ===
Singapore began to restrict travellers from entering from 29 January in a progressive manner as a response to localised outbreaks. Travellers were banned gradually in phases between January and 23 March; only people who are in essential services were allowed entry, the last phase required all travellers to undergo a "stay-home notice" (SHN) at hotels. Port calls for all cruise vessels were stopped from 13 March as well.

Due to the reduced number of flights, Singapore Changi Airport suspended operations at Terminals 2 and 4 in April and May 2020 respectively. Terminal 4 became a Dino-themed funland and vaccination centre. Malaysia would also shorten the operating hours of Sultan Iskandar Building at the Johor Causeway to 12 hours daily from 24 April, effectively limiting the Causeway's operating hours. The Second Link crossing would remain open round the clock.

On 28 June 2020, Prime Minister Lee Hsien Loong and then Malaysia Prime Minister Muhyiddin Yassin agreed that their governments would work together to establish a Periodic Commuting Arrangement (PCA) allowing residents from both nations who hold long-term immigration passes for business and work purposes in the other country to periodically return to their home countries for short-term home leave. The Reciprocal Green Lane (RGL) and the Periodic Commuting Arrangement (PCA) were launched in August 2020. The RGL scheme will allow essential business and official travel between the two countries while the PCA scheme will allow Singaporean and Malaysian residents who hold long-term immigration business and work passes to enter for work purposes. Travel bubble arrangements with Malaysia, Germany and South Korea were suspended due to emergence of COVID-19 variant of concern, whereas in future, Singapore and Malaysia had plans to recognise each other's COVID-19 vaccine certificates with the goal of restoring cross-border travel.

Cruises were restarted in November but did not have any other port of call other than Singapore. In early December, an 83-year-old man tested positive on board and the ship had to return to Singapore a day early. Subsequent retests of the sample and additional samples proved the original test to be a false positive.

=== Repatriation efforts ===
As the pandemic spread throughout the world, the Singapore government had organised several repatriation efforts to bring Singaporeans back from various overseas locations. MFA and other governmental agencies subsequently brought back at least 1,000 (Note: Distribution of people evacuated by countries: Slovenia: 1; Egypt: 244; India: 699; Saudi Arabia: 85; Fiji: 7; Total: 1,016) Singaporeans, permanent residents, and family members stranded at other locations where there were similar lockdowns and suspension of flights: Cambodia, Egypt, Fiji, India, Iran, Nepal, Saudi Arabia, Slovenia, and the UK. Most of the evacuees were brought back on direct flights, whilst some in Fiji, Iran, Nepal, and Slovenia saw some assistance from other countries. All evacuees had to serve a 14-day Stay Home Notice or be quarantined at designated locations, such as hotels with cost borne by the government, government quarantine faculties, or at home.

With flights to Wuhan suspended due to the Hubei lockdown, Scoot had offered two one-way flights back to Wuhan for tourists stuck in Singapore. As the travel restrictions began to grow and accumulated into an ongoing ban on short-term visitors arriving or transiting through Singapore which started from 23 March, Singapore had allowed visitors to transit through Singapore if they are being repatriated by various governments. India had repatriated some of its citizens from Singapore in May 2020 on two separate flights. In the same flight which Singapore Airlines brought back Singaporeans from Cambodia on 12 April, it also carried Australians heading back to Australia with Singapore being a transit point. It was reported that Singapore and Bangladesh were in discussions to repatriate their respective citizens if necessary.

=== Assistance to other countries ===
Both the Singapore government and private sector sent support packages to Indonesia, including test kits and personal protective equipment. The Singapore government sent swabs and other supplies to Malaysia to help with sample collection and testing. Temasek Foundation donated 30,000 test kits to India and this was affirmed and thanked by High Commissioner of India to Singapore, Jawed Ashraf. Indian low-cost airline SpiceJet operated flights carrying the test kits and other medical equipment from Singapore to both Bangalore and Chennai.

In December 2020, Singapore pledged US$5 million towards COVID-19 Vaccine Global Access (COVAX), a WHO-led global initiative aimed at securing COVID-19 vaccines for low- and middle-income countries. Together with Switzerland, Singapore co-chairs "Friends of the COVID-19 Vaccine Global Access (COVAX) Facility", which comprises the European Union and the following 14 nations: Australia, Canada, Iceland, Israel, Japan, the Kingdom of Saudi Arabia, New Zealand, Norway, Qatar, the Republic of Korea, Singapore, Switzerland, the United Arab Emirates, and the United Kingdom.

On 26 April 2021, the Singapore Indian Chamber of Commerce and Industry (SICCI) and Little India Shopkeepers Association (LISHA) initiated and launched a relief fund to raise money and support India in its fight against COVID-19.

On 31 August 2021, Singapore agreed to support Australia by sending 500,000 doses of Pfizer-BioNTech to aid Australia's coronavirus battle exacerbated by Delta variant. Based on the agreement, Australia will return the doses by December 2021.

On 28 September 2021, Singapore sent more than 120,000 doses of the AstraZeneca vaccine to Batam and Riau islands of Indonesia. Similarly, Singapore sent 100,000 doses of Moderna to Brunei on 29 September to help them tackle the pandemic.

== Economic measures ==
With the impact of COVID-19 becoming greater, it was becoming clear to analysts that Singapore would need to respond with large scale government spending. In the Budget 2020, the Government provided help in four consecutive budget periods, under Unity Budget, Resilience Budget, Solidarity Budget and Fortitude Budget. All Singaporeans had $600 deposited into the bank account in 2020. In the Budget 2021, the $800 million support package was rolled out, where JSS was further increased to 50 per cent in hardest hit sectors. The government announced on 4 June 2020 that they would be keeping Central Provident Fund contribution rates unchanged as they believed the Jobs Support Scheme would help reduce the burden on employers.

It was announced that the government would draw an additional S$32 billion from past reserves, bringing the total used to S$52 billion. In addition, another S$13 billion will be set aside for contingencies due to the pandemic. Extending and enhancing the JSS, to include higher tiers of wage subsidies and lasting until August, would cost around S$2.9 billion, bringing the total cost to S$23.5 billion. The government introduced a one-off Solidarity Utilities Credit of S$100 for all households since many people were remote working. Food and beverage (F&B) and retail companies would receive up to S$10,000 as part of efforts to digitally transform their businesses, as they are likely to be seriously affected by safe distancing rules. S$2 billion was committed to SGUnited Jobs and Skills Package was announced to create more jobs and traineeships.

To help financial institutions and FinTech companies tide over the COVID-19 pandemic, the Monetary Authority of Singapore (MAS) released a $125 million package to help financial institutions and FinTech companies to strengthen long-term capabilities.

On 14 April, the Infocomm Media Development Authority announced that they will launch Public Service Content worth S$8 million and fund 90% of the course fees for Self-Employed Persons under Talent Assistance (T-Assist) Programme. To reduce operating costs, the Film Exhibition and Distribution Licence Fees will be waived from 17 April.

Every Singaporean who would be aged 18 and above in 2020 would receive S$100 worth of SingapoRediscovers vouchers, which can be used for a variety activities to support the local tourism industry. They were planned to be usable between December 2020 and June 2021 and would be paid via SingPass. Additionally, Trip.com has a "Pay It Forward" campaign throughout this usable period, where people can use their vouchers to pay for tourism products for various beneficiary groups. When the vouchers were launched, there were some complaints from Singaporeans about the complex way the vouchers were to be redeemed. On 30 April 2021, the Singapore Tourism Board (STB) announced that the expiry date of the SingapoRediscovers vouchers will be extended to 31 December 2021, and that improvements to the redemption process will be rolled out.

== Controversies ==
=== Discrimination against healthcare workers ===
In February 2020, incidents were reported of healthcare workers such as nurses and ambulance drivers being ostracised, as members of the public who feared that their contact with coronavirus patients would pose an infection risk. Such acts were condemned by the authorities, who exhorted the public to show support and appreciation for their work. Ride-hailing service Grab announced the launch of GrabCare, a dedicated service for healthcare workers to obtain transport to and from their work places, in order to alleviate their difficulty of finding rides.

On 12 April 2020, CNA reported that some staff members of Lee Ah Mooi Old Age Home were evicted by landlords after a cluster of cases was reported at the home.

=== Living conditions at foreign worker dormitories ===
Despite effective handling of initial waves of infection, several serious outbreaks in April have brought the situation in Singapore out of control; many analysts points to poor conditions at foreign workers dormitories as a major factor of the failure.

The pandemic brought the living conditions at foreign worker dormitories to media attention. Dormitories were reported to be unsanitary and crowded, making preventive measures like social distancing difficult. Retired diplomat Tommy Koh criticised the living conditions, calling it "third world" and "a time bomb waiting to explode". Amnesty International called the situation a "recipe for disaster". Minister for Manpower Josephine Teo vowed to improve the living conditions of foreign workers after the quarantine was handled.

While churches in the 1960s and 1970s historically championed social justice and advocacy for worker rights within the Singaporean civil society, this has declined over the years due to the rise of a middle class and a dependency on state-centric growth. During the pandemic, Singaporean churches sought ways to bring about "neighbourly love" and national prayer. But some criticised this as not being enough to address the inequalities experienced by foreign workers who were disproportionately affected by the virus.

On 9 April, MOM said in a press release that it will improve quality of meals of foreign workers during quarantine and formed a task force to improve the living conditions of foreign workers. As of 25 April, twenty-five dormitories have been gazetted as isolation areas. Some healthy workers are also progressively being moved to numerous empty premises such as SAF camps, HDB blocks, floating hotels and Changi Exhibition Centre. On 16 April, Minister for Manpower Josephine Teo said that there will be a "three-pronged strategy"; containing the spread, imposing lockdowns and separating workers in essential services.

Minister of National Development Lawrence Wong has said that the living standards in dormitories have steadily improved over the years, and suggested that the issue was the dormitories being designed for communal living, where migrant workers ate, lived, and cooked together, and that the initial precautions and safeguards put in place to reduce some of the non-essential activities were not sufficient. The government has promised to build new dormitories that are designed with public health in mind and provide more amenities, while some workers will be temporarily moved to makeshift dormitories before the new dormitories are ready.

It is noted that a large majority of COVID-19 cases in Singapore are foreign workers. On 20 April, Singapore reported a peak of 1,426 new cases, of which only 16 were not migrant workers but citizens or permanent residents. Foreign workers had accounted for three-fourths of the total infections in Singapore by then.

Towards the end of July 2020, a spate of attempted and successful suicides among the foreign workers in dormitories raised concerns about the mental well-being of the workers on lockdown. Authorities are monitoring the situation and are working with partners and NGOs to enhance their mental health support programmes.

=== Social distancing on public transport ===
Outside the lockdowns, social distancing was not required when on board public transportation, and it was not practical due to the high volume of commuters. The Minister of National Development Lawrence Wong explained that resulting reduction of passenger capacity will involve major society disruptions, such as lateness for work, more unnecessary increase of transportation, more manpower strength and enforcement. Authorities instead urged employers to allow more remote work and flexible work arrangements to reduce the demand for public transport. With that, social distancing measures are only implemented in the lockdown periods, with stickers pasted on alternate seats to indicate that they should not be used, and auxiliary officers and transport ambassadors enforcing the rules throughout this period. Public transportation has resumed pre-lockdown operations after the period of lockdown, social distancing stickers were removed on bus and train seats, allowing all seats to be used. Regulations for social distancing were no longer applicable except in fixed queuing area such as in MRT stations and bus interchanges. Mask wearing continues to be mandatory in public transport and most places in Singapore. Since 29 March 2022, mask wearing is optional but still encouraged in some outdoor places in Singapore.

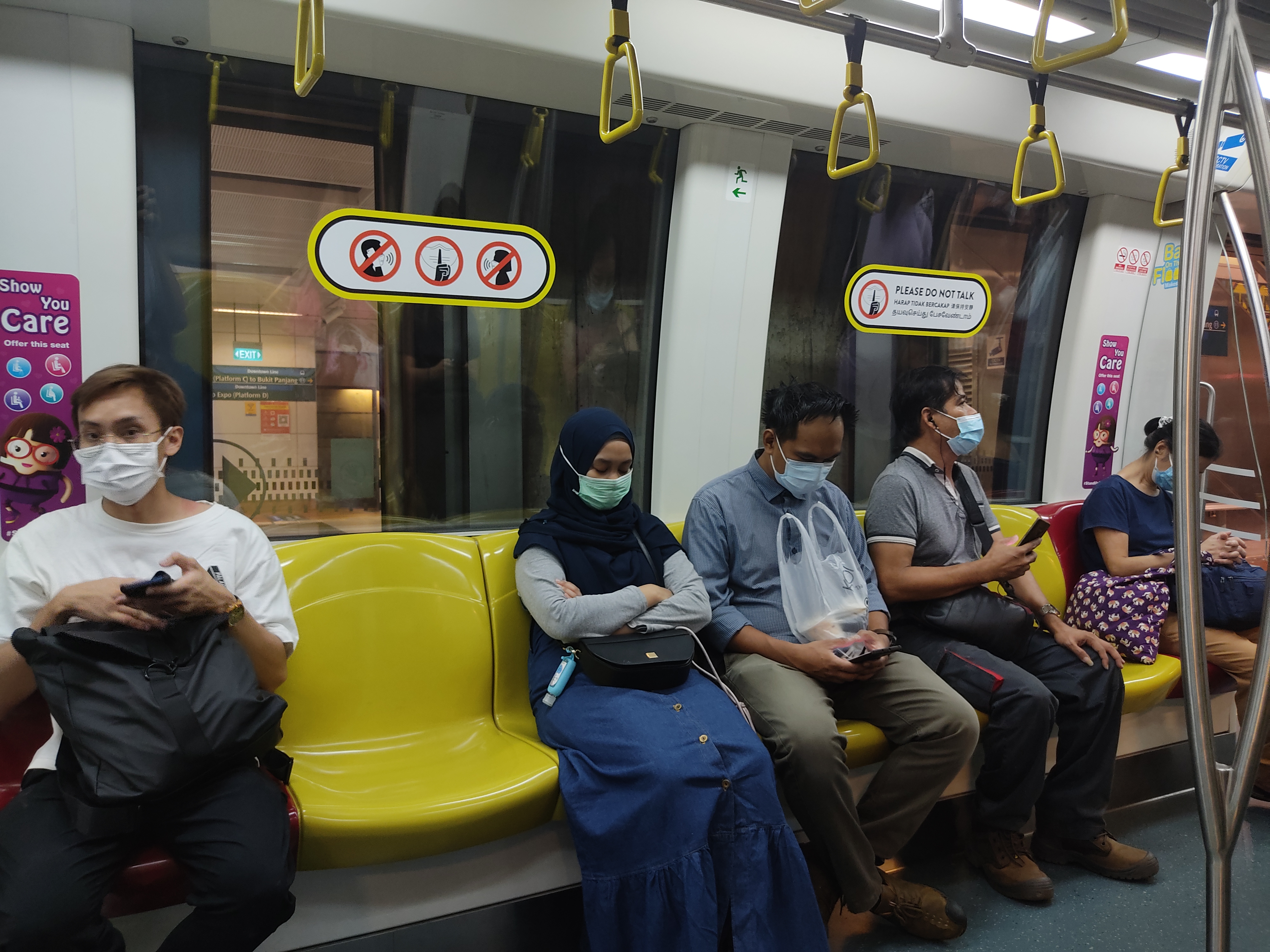
Passengers with masks with signs indicating passengers not to talk in trains

=== Contact tracing data privacy issues ===
On 4 January 2021, Minister of State for Home Affairs Desmond Tan announced in Parliament that Bluetooth proximity data from the TraceTogether app and token could be used by the police in criminal investigations, as per the Criminal Procedure Code. This resulted in significant backlash, as the announcement contradicted previous statements that the data would strictly be used for contact tracing; concerns were aired about the transparency of the government and how the personal data would be used, as well as possible infringement on the privacy of citizens. Some users even switched off their apps or left their tokens at home in protest. In response, Minister-in-charge of the Smart Nation Initiative Vivian Balakrishnan clarified that the police could only obtain TraceTogether data through a person involved in the investigation, adding that there were plans to introduce legislation that would restrict police use of TraceTogether data to serious offences such as terrorism or murder. The COVID-19 (Temporary Measures) (Amendment) Bill was passed on 2 February, which included a possible extension of the COVID-19 Control Order to next year and beyond if the situation does not improve or worsens, as well as the removal of SafeEntry/TraceTogether data at the end of the pandemic.

=== Home based businesses ===
During the initial announcement of "circuit breaker" lockdown measures restricting movement and business activities, inclusive of home-based businesses, in 2020. There was initial confusion over the measures affecting home-based food-business and former television actress Ateeqah Mazlan was shown in social media attempting to get responses from the relevant authorities. The measures affected the Malay community as such home-based food-business are an important source of income for the community during Ramadan. It was later clarified by the Ministry of Trade and Industry, the Ministry of the Environment and Water Resources, the Housing and Development Board (HDB) and the Urban Redevelopment Authority in a joint statement saying that home-based food-business need to meet certain criteria to operate during the lockdown measures.

This led to a Change.org petition asking HDB relax the rules for home-based food business during the lockdown measures which had more than 69,000 signatures. Minister for Social and Family Development and Minister-in-charge of Muslim Affairs Masagos Zulkifli was alarmed at the petition, citing home-based food-business operators who tried to get exceptions are "irresponsible" and that "they know the Government cannot make exceptions to any sector affected in the tighter circuit breaker period". He asked for operators's cooperation and understanding and listed how had home-based food business operators been supported since the measures were implemented. President Halimah Yacob, in a Facebook post, drew attention that such home-based food-business are important to their families due to their constraints and that it was the most profitable and important period to earn and save for them. She also noted that she often patronised such home-based food business.

After a few days, National Development Minister Lawrence Wong eased the lockdown measures for home-based food-business operators if they followed certain safety measures such as contactless delivery of orders, among other things. During Parliament, Intan Azura Mokhtar spoke up for the home-based food-business and asked why the government decided to “back-pedal” on the measures which Masagos denied, saying it had to make “tough choices between preserving livelihoods and preserving life itself”.

Assistant Professor Walid Jumblatt Abdullah, a political scientist from Nanyang Technological University, said Halimah might have posted the post due to possible strong reactions from the Malay-Muslim community and their unhappiness that Masagos's response showed "a government decree must not be questioned and must be followed to the letter". Researchers Faizal Yahya and Mohamad Shamsuri Juhari from the Institute of Policy Studies research centre said that Masagos's response need to be examined with the context of “prevailing uncertainties” and the links between health, safety and economic activities.

== See also ==
- COVID-19 pandemic in Asia
- Public health mitigation of COVID-19
- Treatment and management of COVID-19
- Living with COVID-19
