= Capital punishment in Ghana =

Capital punishment is a legal penalty in Ghana only for high treason. Ghana executed a criminal for the last time in 1993. The method of execution is by firing squad. It is considered "abolitionist in practice." Capital punishment was a mandatory sentence for certain ordinary criminal offenses until 2023.

Seven new death sentences were handed down in 2021, while 165 people were on death row in Ghana at the end of 2021.

On 25 July 2023, the Parliament of Ghana voted to legally abolish capital punishment for ordinary offences. Capital punishment remains a prescribed penalty under the constitution for high treason. The country's legal code was amended to replace capital punishment with life imprisonment. The legislation was tabled by Francis-Xavier Kojo Sosu, who described it as a "great advancement of the human rights record of Ghana."

The abolition of the death penalty in Ghana is not retroactive; as of August 2023 death sentences continued to be handed down for crimes committed before the abolition went into effect.

In July 2026 the Ghanaian government accepted recommendations to amend the constitution to abolish the death penalty and replace it with life imprisonment. As of 2026 legislation is currently pending.
