= 2020 Singapore circuit breaker measures =

Measures to prevent spread of COVID-19 in Singapore

- Part of the COVID-19 pandemic in Singapore
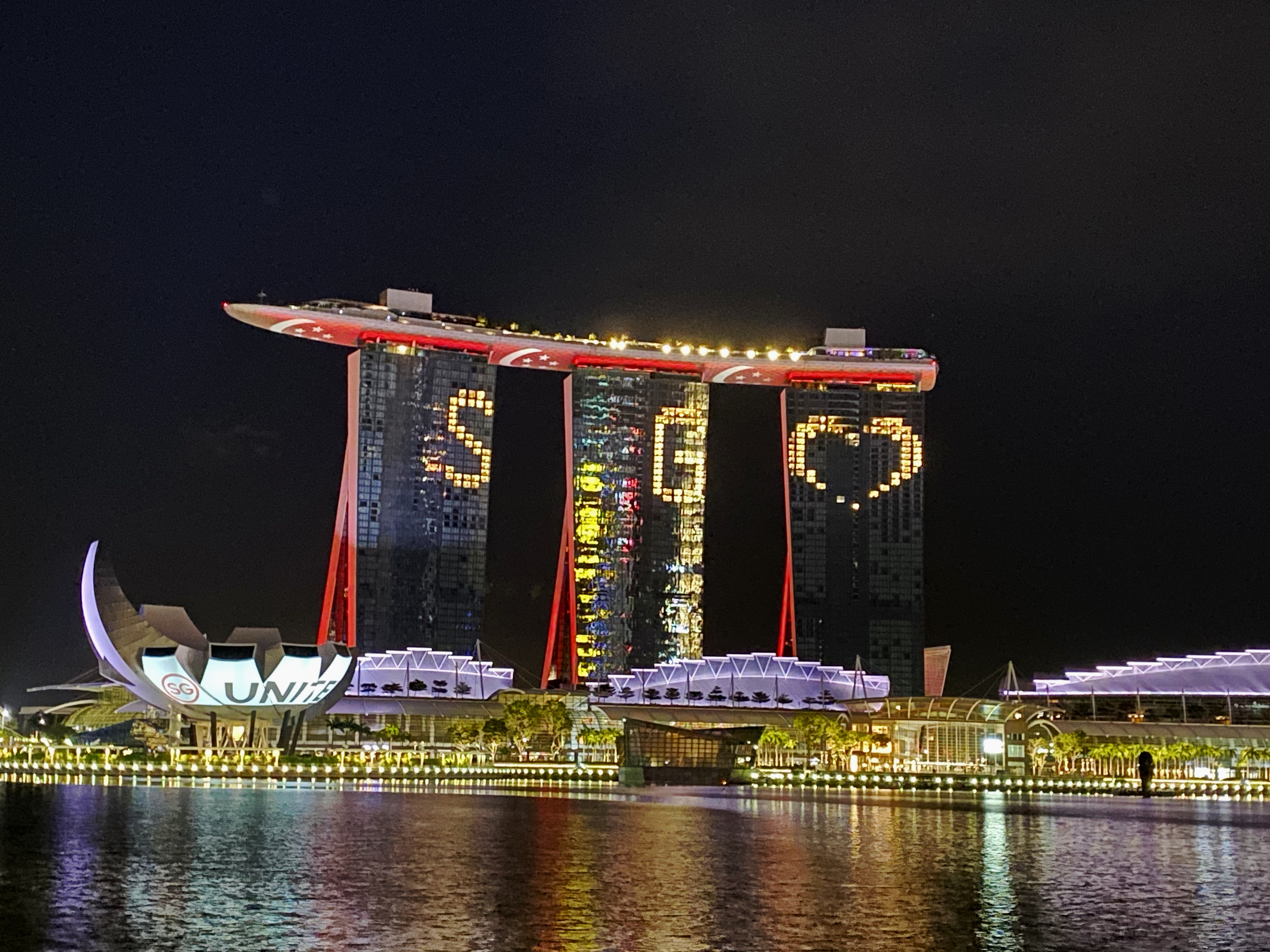
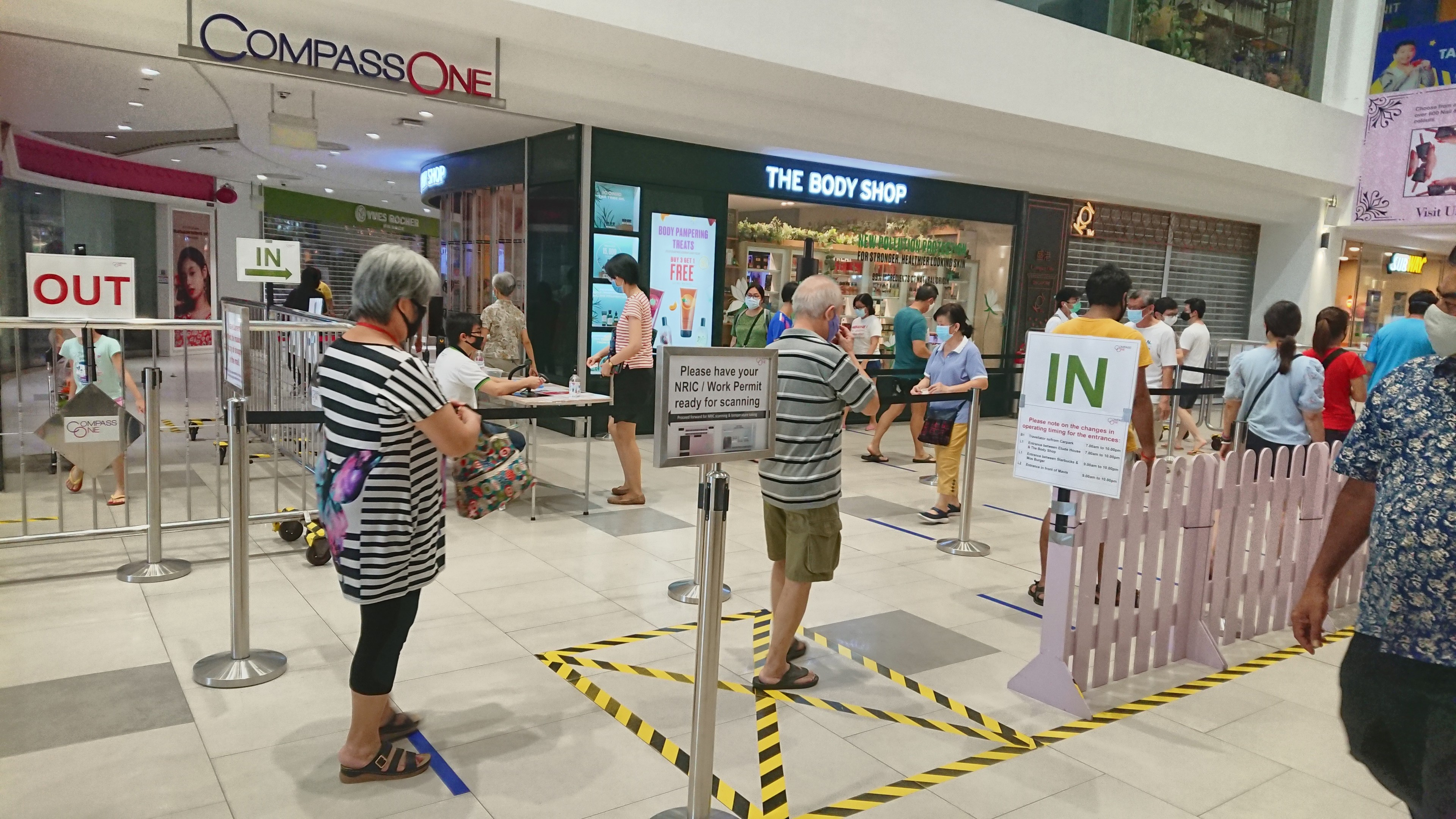
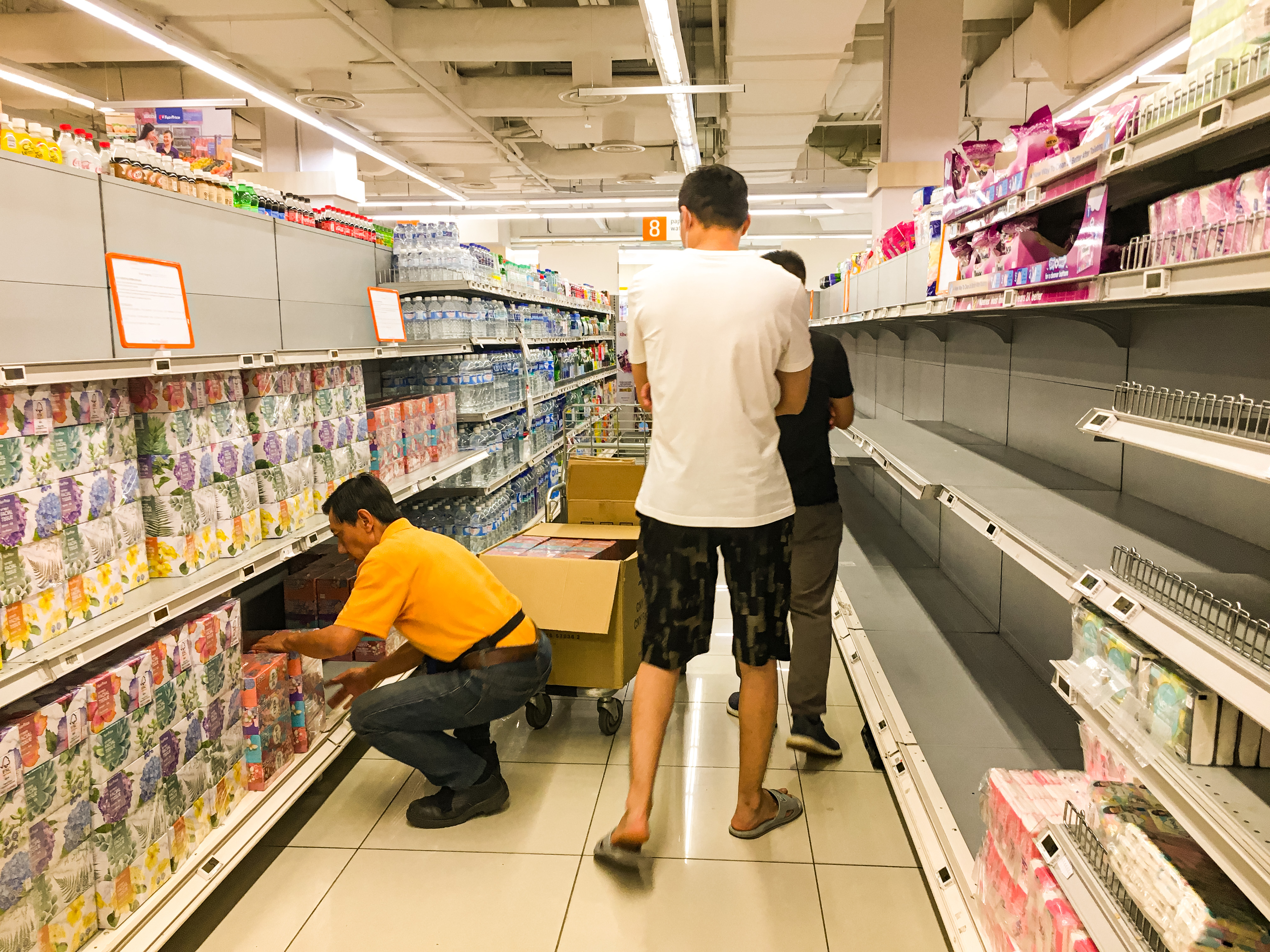
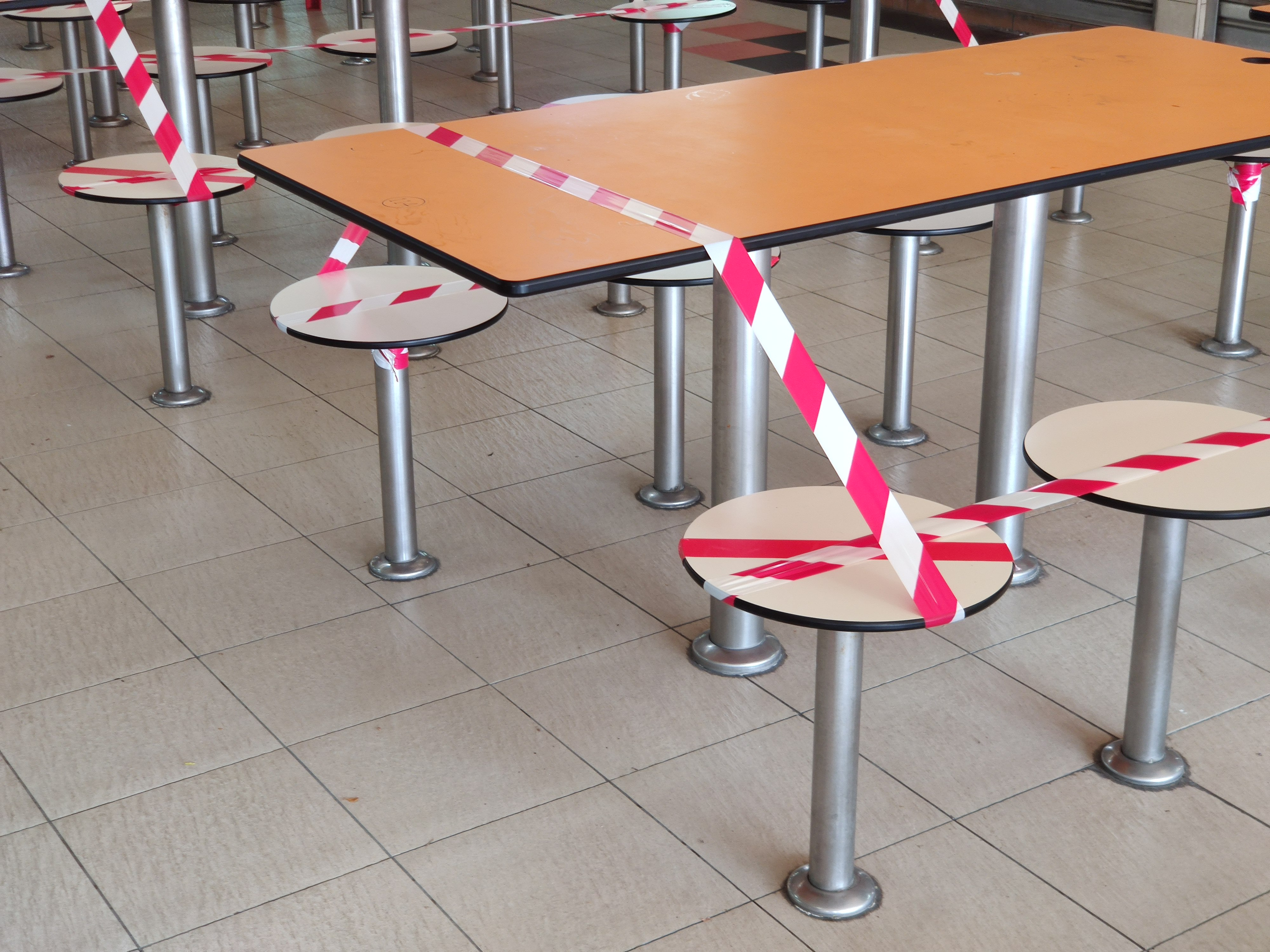
- (clockwise from top): Marina Bay Sands and ArtScience Museum lit up with messages of hope; Controlled entry into Compass One; Tables and seats cordoned off with tape; Empty shelves after panic buying at a FairPrice supermarket
- Date: 7 April 2020 – 1 June 2020 (1 month, 3 weeks, and 4 days)
- Location: Singapore
- Caused by: COVID-19 pandemic in Singapore
- Goals: Containment of the pandemic
- Methods: Default remote work for non-essential workplaces; Default Home-Based Learning (HBL) for all schools; Closure and suspension of religious activities; Restrictions on social gatherings/home visitors (during lockdown, only 2 person is allowed; otherwise 5 persons); Food establishments are prohibited from dining in, only allowed to offer takeaways, drive-thru and delivery services; Social gatherings in private and public places are banned.; Masks were made compulsory from 14 April 2020 and relaxed on 29 March 2022 (outdoors) and 29 August 2022 (indoors), and the remainder on 13 February 2023 (public transport and some healthcare areas); Closure of some essential shops that were made non-essential from 21 April 2020 (some restrictions were lifted on 12 May 2020)
- Status: All restrictions were lifted by 13 February 2023
- Result: Some restrictions in Singapore

The 2020 Singapore circuit breaker measures were a stay-at-home order and cordon sanitaire implemented as a preventive measure by the Government of Singapore in response to the COVID-19 pandemic in the country on 7 April 2020.

The measures were brought into legal effect by the Minister for Health with the COVID-19 (Temporary Measures) (Control Order) Regulations 2020, published on 7 April 2020. Singapore had relatively few COVID-19 cases before the emergence of the Delta and Omicron variants from 8 May 2021 to 29 March 2022.

With its relative success in curbing the early spread of the virus in Singapore, the term "circuit breaker" and its measures was subsequently adopted by other countries, particularly in Canada and the United Kingdom.

== Etymology ==
The term circuit breaker is described as a euphemism of a lockdown by people such as Sarah Newey of The Daily Telegraph, PN Balji in South China Morning Post, and Daniel Moss in Bloomberg. It is described as a "partial lockdown" by Wan Ting Koh of Yahoo News and Yen Nee Lee of CNBC, as a "lockdown" by The Straits Times, and "encompassing lockdown orders" by Lakeisha Leo and Kurt Ganapathy of Channel NewsAsia.

It is derived from the physical circuit breaker according to Lee Hsien Loong and Gan Kim Yong; Gan says that when an electrical system encounters a problem, it trips and everything is shut off, and triage can only be performed by individually restoring the switches.

== Chronology ==
Singapore recorded its first COVID-19 case on 23 January 2020. With that, many Singaporeans have purchased and worn masks when not at home; practiced social distancing and on 7 February 2020, Singapore raised the Disease Outbreak Response System Condition (DORSCON) level from Yellow to Orange in response to additional local cases of uncertain origin.

=== Prelude (27 March) ===
On 24 March, the Multi-Ministry Task Force announced stricter measures to combat the spread of COVID-19, after a huge spike in cases originating from returning Singaporeans in the community. These measures include the closure of entertainment venues, tuition and enrichment centres and places of worship. Malls, retail establishments and tourist attractions were required to reduce their crowd density to stay open. Gatherings of more than 10 people outside work and school are prohibited.

=== Lockdown measures ===
On 3 April 2020, Prime Minister Lee Hsien Loong announced a nationwide partial lockdown, known as a circuit breaker, to contain the spread of COVID-19 in Singapore. These measures came after an increase of unlinked cases over the preceding month, as well as the risk of a huge cluster of infections. Most of the workplaces were converted to remote work as default during the lockdown and schools were transitioned to home-based learning thereafter. As dining-in is a high-risk activity; all food establishments were only allowed to offer take-away, drive-thru and delivery of food. Non-essential advertising at shopping centres are not allowed to be shown or advertised and only advertising from essential service offers and safe management measures such as mask wearing and social distancing are allowed. Social gatherings of any size, in homes or public spaces such as parks and Housing Board void decks, were also banned.

These measures only took effect from 7 April 2020 to 1 June 2020, 16 May 2021 to 13 June 2021 and 22 July 2021 to 9 August 2021.

On 14 April, Minister for National Development Lawrence Wong announced that the wearing of masks became compulsory when not at home with immediate effect, with fines and prosecution for offenders who refuse to do so.

=== Tightened measures (21 April) ===
After discovering that the unknown number of cases was greater than expected, Prime Minister Lee Hsien Loong announced on 21 April an extension of the circuit breaker to 1 June. Existing measures were also tightened until 4 May initially, including shrinking the list of essential services, such as closing all close-contact service providers such as hair salons, as well as restricting entry to certain hotspots like wet markets and some essential retail franchises going by the last digit of one's ID number. Popular markets used an odd/even date entry restriction; ID ending with odd numbers are only allowed entry on odd dates of the month and ID ending with even numbers are only allowed entry on even dates on the month. On 21 April, the Ministry of Education brought forward the 4-week school holidays for all MOE Kindergartens, primary, secondary and Pre-University students, which are usually held in June, to May. Institutes of Higher Learning extended their Home-based Learning. The Singapore franchise of McDonald's also shut all of its restaurants islandwide, as a response to a number of its employees being infected.

=== Relaxed measures (2 May) ===
Some restrictions were relaxed progressively in stages to prepare for the end of the circuit breaker on 1 June. Traditional Chinese medicine (TCM) shops and essential condo activities were allowed to reopen on 5 May, followed by businesses like home-based bakeries, some food shops, barbers (only basic haircuts), manufacturing of confectionery, and laundry shops on 12 May. Schools resumed face-to-face lessons for smaller groups in graduating cohorts and those requiring urgent assistance on 19 May.

On 8 May, the MOH announced that all TCM shops are allowed to sell retail products again from 12 May, after receiving feedback from seniors that travelling to the initially allowed 130 TCM medical halls was too far for them.

== SafeEntry and TraceTogether ==
The Ministry of Health mandated the use of SafeEntry and TraceTogether, which is also called TraceTogether-only SafeEntry (TT-only SE) during the COVID-19 pandemic. Scanning in/out using the TraceTogether-only SafeEntry (TT-only SE) either through the TraceTogether app or token was made mandatory for all Singaporeans and at all places such as cinemas, restaurants, workplaces, schools and shopping malls for contact tracing purposes. These included the device called SafeEntry Gateway (Check in and check out) to enable users to scan in and out. In addition, TraceTogether also showed vaccination status and pre-event testing (PET) status whether the person test positive or negative for COVID-19. Tokens could be collected from the community centres and vending machines.

== Post-circuit breaker (reopening) ==
Earlier in 2020, three planned phases of reopening were announced, which were part of a wider zero-COVID effort. Efforts for a smooth transition were hampered by surges in cases caused by the Delta and Omicron variants, resulting in intermittent tightening and loosening of movement restrictions throughout 2021 and 2022.

- Phase 1 (a loosened form of Heightened Alert) started on 2 June 2020. This phase allowed for gatherings and home visits of up to 5 people, but no dining-in and unmasked activity is allowed.
- Phase 2 ran between 19 June 2020 (with dining-in and unmasked activity of up to 2 persons) and 17 July 2020 (with dining-in and unmasked activity of up to 5 persons).
- Phase 3 officially started on 28 December 2020 and was halted on 8 May 2021.

On 4 May 2021, Lawrence Wong announced that the slate of restrictions set to take effect on 8 May 2021 would effectively bring the country back to Phase 2 while it combated a surge in cases. In mid-May 2021 the country's Ministry of Health announced the introduction of a Phase 2 (Heightened Alert) as domestically transmitted cases continued to mount, with a slate of measures that lasted from 16 May 2021 to 13 June 2021. This was subsequently followed by a gradual loosening of measures (dubbed "Phase 3 (Heightened Alert)"), until the authoritites reverted to Phase 2 (Heightened Alert) on 19 July 2021 due to the formation of new local clusters.The second slate of Phase 2 (Heightened Alert) measures would last until 18 August 2021. The government then gradually ceased to used the phased approach, instead focusing of a fostering "COVID-19 Resilent" society, with the Ministry of Health announcing the easing- in two stages- of the Phase 2 (Heightened Alert) restrictions on 6 August 2021.

In addition, it was announced on 14 December 2020 that the Pfizer-BioNTech vaccine was approved for use in Singapore, with the first batch slated for around end of December 2020. On 3 February 2021, the Moderna vaccine was approved for use in Singapore, with the first batch arriving around March 2021. Subsequent batches for both vaccines were planned to arrive throughout 2021. A successful mass vaccination campaign was launched that achieved very high vaccination rate.

== Non-compliance ==
Through 2021, there were several high-profile instances of people, such as Phoon Chiu Yoke, refusing to abide by the circuit breaker regulations.

== See also ==
- COVID-19 lockdowns
- COVID-19 lockdown in China
- COVID-19 lockdown in India
- COVID-19 lockdown in Italy
- COVID-19 community quarantines in the Philippines
- Enhanced community quarantine in Luzon
- Indonesia large-scale social restrictions
- Malaysian movement control order
