= The Angel, the Devil and I =

Singaporean online drama series

The Angel, the Devil and I is an online English drama series produced by the Singaporean government in 2018, starring Mark Lee, Judee Tan, Serina Sng, Stella Seah and Vee. Its content is primarily related to civic education in Singapore.

== Theme ==
Episode	Primary theme
1	Healthy food in Chinese New Year
2	Healthy food cooking
3	Daily life habit of environmental protection
4	Fake news
5	Wealth management
6	Career Connect by Singaporean
7	SingPass
8	Personal health check
