= Singpass =

Singapore government app

Singpass (sometimes spelled SingPass) is an application developed by the Government Technology Agency of Singapore (GovTech). The app allows Singaporeans to access government e-services and show identity documents.

== History ==
Singpass was initially introduced as a single password, known as the Singpass PIN, to provide access to government e-services. Previously, online government transactions, such as income tax filing, used the Central Provident Fund (CPF) PAL PIN system, which was available to about 2.5 million CPF members. Singpass was also known as Singapore Personal Access. Anyone aged 15 or above can apply for a Singpass password.

The Singpass mobile application was launched by the Government Technology Agency of Singapore (GovTech) in 2018. It enables users to access government e-services through biometric authentication, such as fingerprint or facial recognition, or a six-digit PIN, instead of entering passwords. The app was designed to simplify authentication and improve security against phishing and credential theft. In March 2020, the mobile app saw one million users.

Singpass Face Verification was introduced in July 2020, allowing users to authenticate online transactions by matching facial scans against the national biometric database, which were compiled through passport and National Registration Identity Card (NRIC) applications. DBS Bank was the first private-sector organisation to integrate the technology into its mobile banking app. In August 2020, GovTech announced plans for a "National Digital Identity ecosystem" to enable users to transact with both public and private-sector organisations through a single digital identity. By December, users could verify their Singpass identities on computers and mobile devices through facial scans or a one-time password sent to another trusted Singpass user.

A new logo was launched in March 2021. GovTech reported that Singpass facilitated more than 170 million transactions in 2020, twice the previous year's volume, as digital transactions increased during the COVID-19 pandemic.The app supported about 1,400 services provided by approximately 140 public-sector and 200 private-sector organisations. In November 2021, Singpass has integrated the digital identity card into the mobile app, providing as an alternative means of proof during transactions at government counters, polyclinics and public libraries. Singpass introduced passkey logins on 1 July 2026.

== Features ==
Though the app, residents can access various government e-services—such as applying for public housing—as well as private-sector services across various industries. Four login methods are available—passkeys, Singpass QR login, Singpass Face Verification and SMS One-Time Passwords. Singpass also authenticates the use of MyInfo, which enables users to auto-fill their personal data on digital application forms for public and commercial platforms, including bank account openings. For in-person transactions, the "verify" feature allows individuals to confirm their identity and share required personal details by scanning QR codes at counters like polyclinics without presenting physical identity documents. Users can also digitally sign legal and commercial agreements using Singpass' built-in PDF viewer. Singpass also sends important government alerts such as passport renewal notices through the app.

== See also ==
- TraceTogether and SafeEntry, the Singapore government's contact-tracing apps during the COVID-19 pandemic
- Diia, a similar app in Ukraine
